= National Eagle Repository =

American wildlife facility in Denver, Colorado

Coordinates: 39°49′41.7″N 104°51′31.5″W

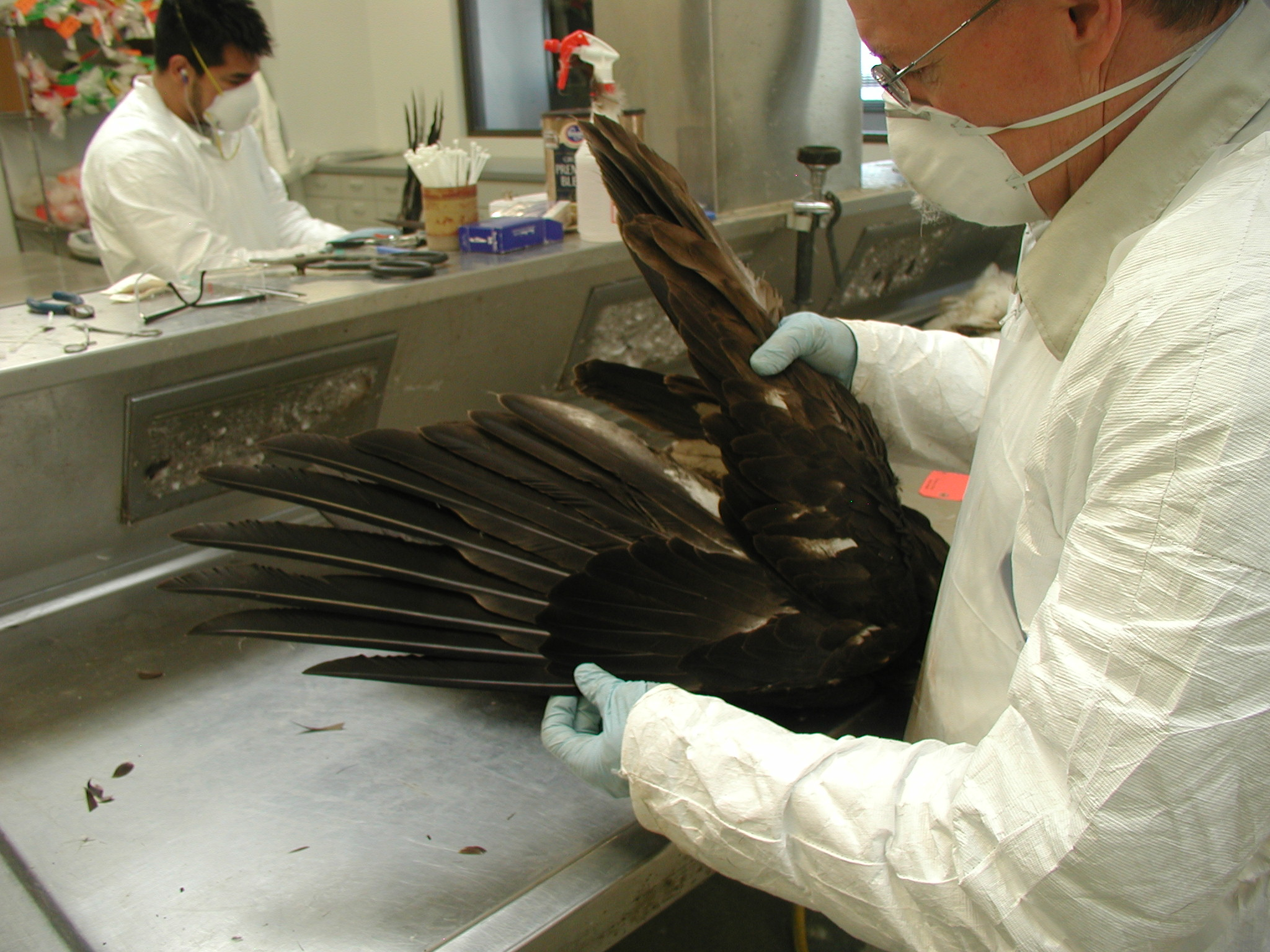
Staff at the National Eagle Repository processing a bald eagle

The National Eagle Repository is operated and managed under the Office of Law Enforcement of the United States Fish and Wildlife Service located at the Rocky Mountain Arsenal National Wildlife Refuge outside of Denver, Colorado. It serves as a central location for the receipt, storage, and distribution of bald and golden eagles that have been found dead. Eagles and eagle parts are available only to Native Americans enrolled in federally recognized tribes for use in religious and cultural ceremonies.

== Mandate ==
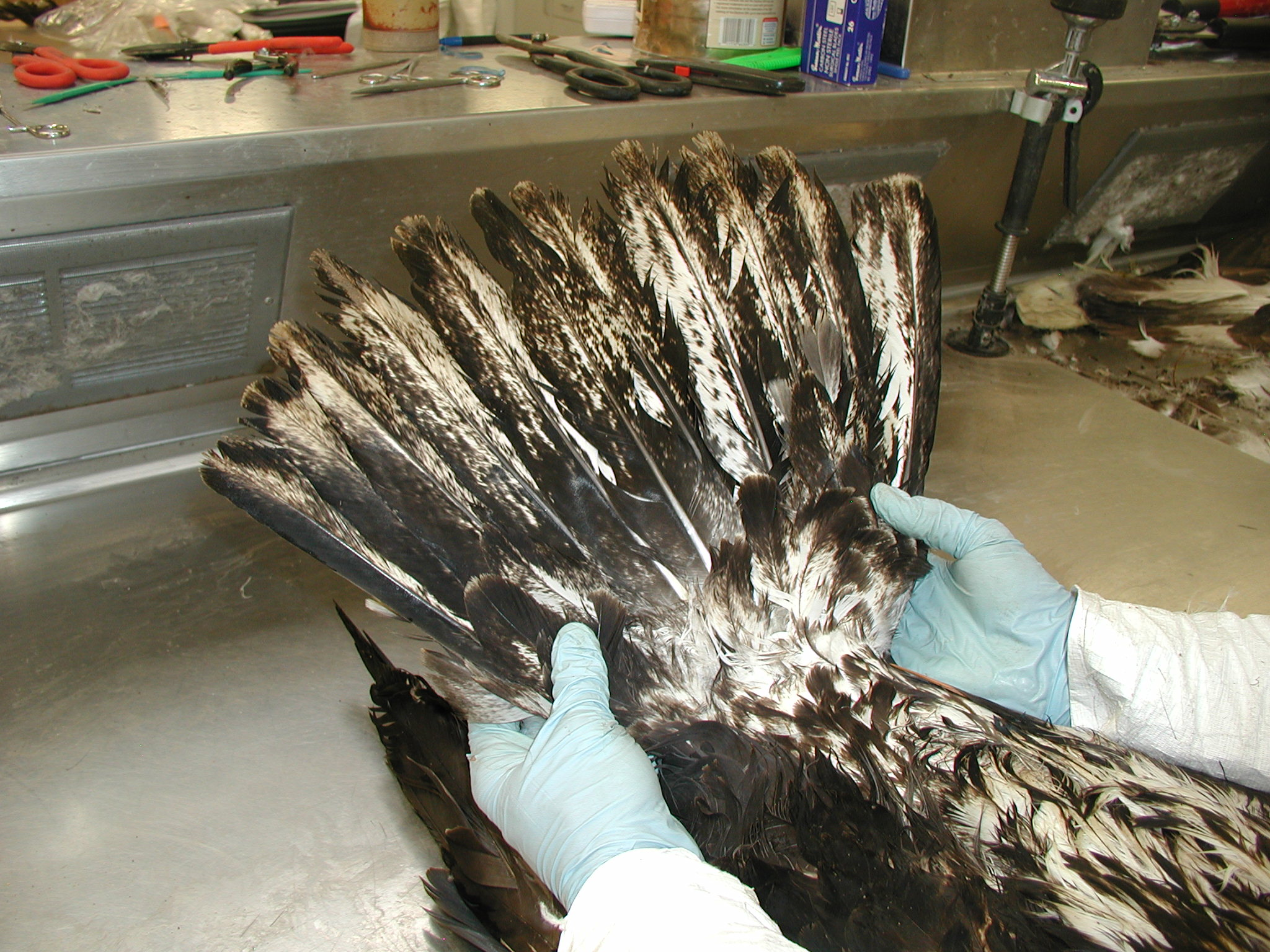
Tail of an eagle at the National Eagle Repository

Distribution is authorized by the Bald and Golden Eagle Protection Act and Regulations in 50 CFR 22. Passed in 1940 and amended in 1962 to include golden eagles, the Bald Eagle Protection Act prohibits the take, transport, sale or barter, and possession of eagles or their parts without a permit. Native Americans who wish to obtain bald or golden eagles or their parts must apply through the United States Fish and Wildlife Service's Migratory Bird Permit Office which services the applicant's state of residence. Orders are filled on a first come, first served basis, with a waiting list of about 6,000 applicants for approximately 2,000 eagles the repository receives, on average, each year. Applicants additionally receive a Fish and Wildlife Service permit which allows them to possess eagles or their parts for religious purposes. Conservation agencies, zoological parks, rehabilitators, and others who may legally possess and transport deceased eagles and their parts are encouraged to send them to the repository so they may be used by Native Americans. Most of the birds died in bird strike, particularly with cars, on overhead power lines or were confiscated from poachers.

== History ==
After the legal protection of the bald eagle, Native Americans had no access to feathers and other parts of the birds they need for certain religious and cultural activities. The best known use is in war bonnets and other feathered headdresses. Some continued hunting and considered it legal on reservation grounds as hunting and their cultural self-determination was guaranteed in treaties. In the early 1970s the National Eagle Repository was operated out of Pocatello, Idaho and in the 1980s distribution was out of the USFWS Forensic Lab in Ashland, Oregon. The office collected birds and distributed them further. But the process was slow and the numbers of birds low.

In 1985 a lawsuit over the prosecution of Dwight Dion Sr., a member of the Yankton Sioux Tribe, for poaching and selling of four bald eagles reached the Supreme Court. In United States v. Dion the court upheld the conviction and confirmed that historic treaty rights could be amended and abrogated by legislation of Congress.

President Bill Clinton signed an executive memorandum on April 29, 1994, after meeting with 300 tribal leaders at the White House. He reformed the National Eagle Repository and obliged all federal agencies to send dead eagles to the repository. Following this memorandum, in 1995 the repository moved to the Denver area and got its own offices at the Rocky Mountain Arsenal.

== Literature ==
- Bruce E. Beans: Eagle’s Plume: The Struggle to Preserve the Life and Haunts of America’s Bald Eagle. Scribner, New York 1996, ISBN 0-684-80696-7
- Alison Renteln: The cultural defense. Oxford University Press, Oxford 2004, ISBN 978-0-19-515402-3.
