= Rocky Mountain Arsenal =

Former U.S. Army chemical weapons manufacturing site

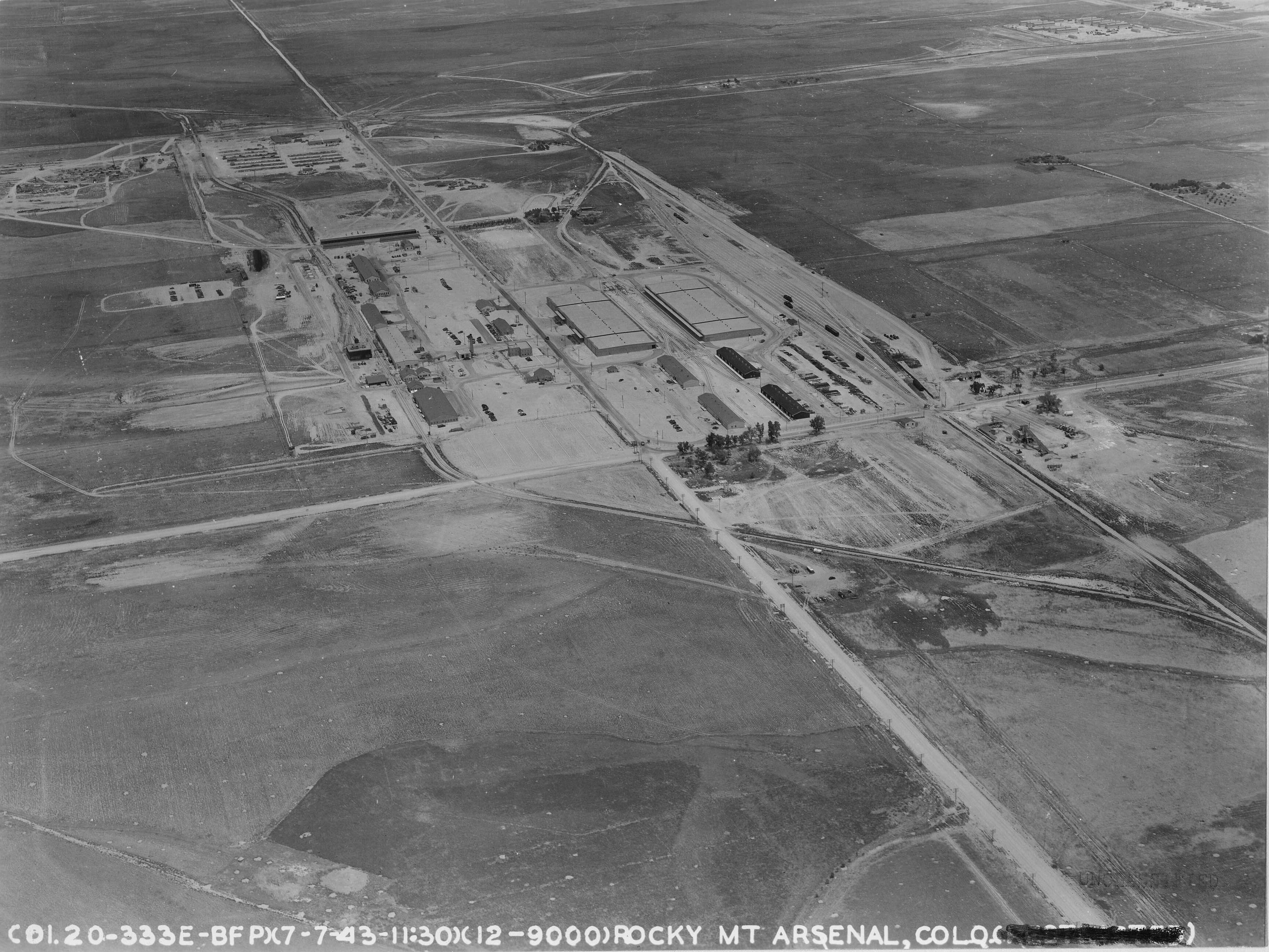
Aerial photo, 1943

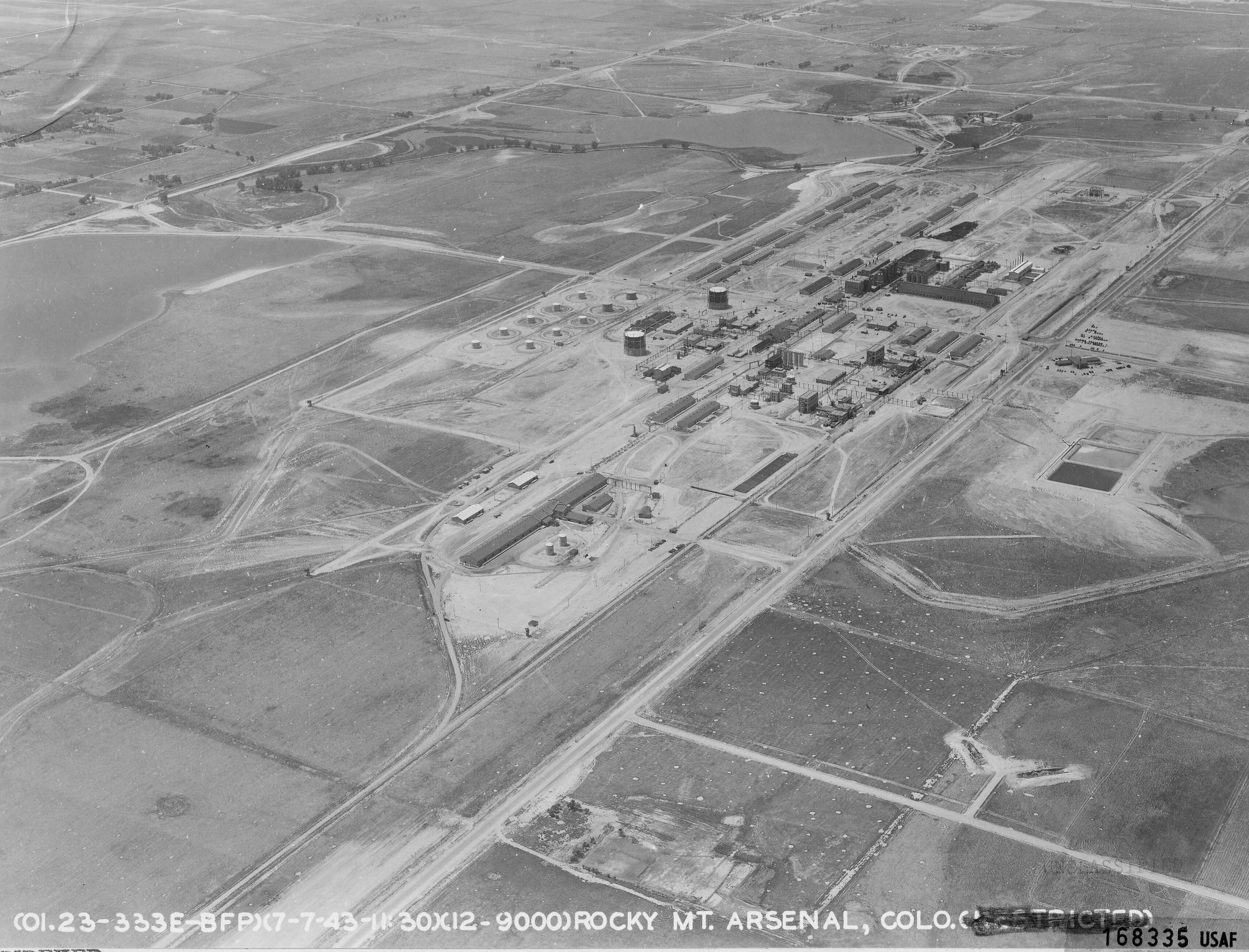
1943

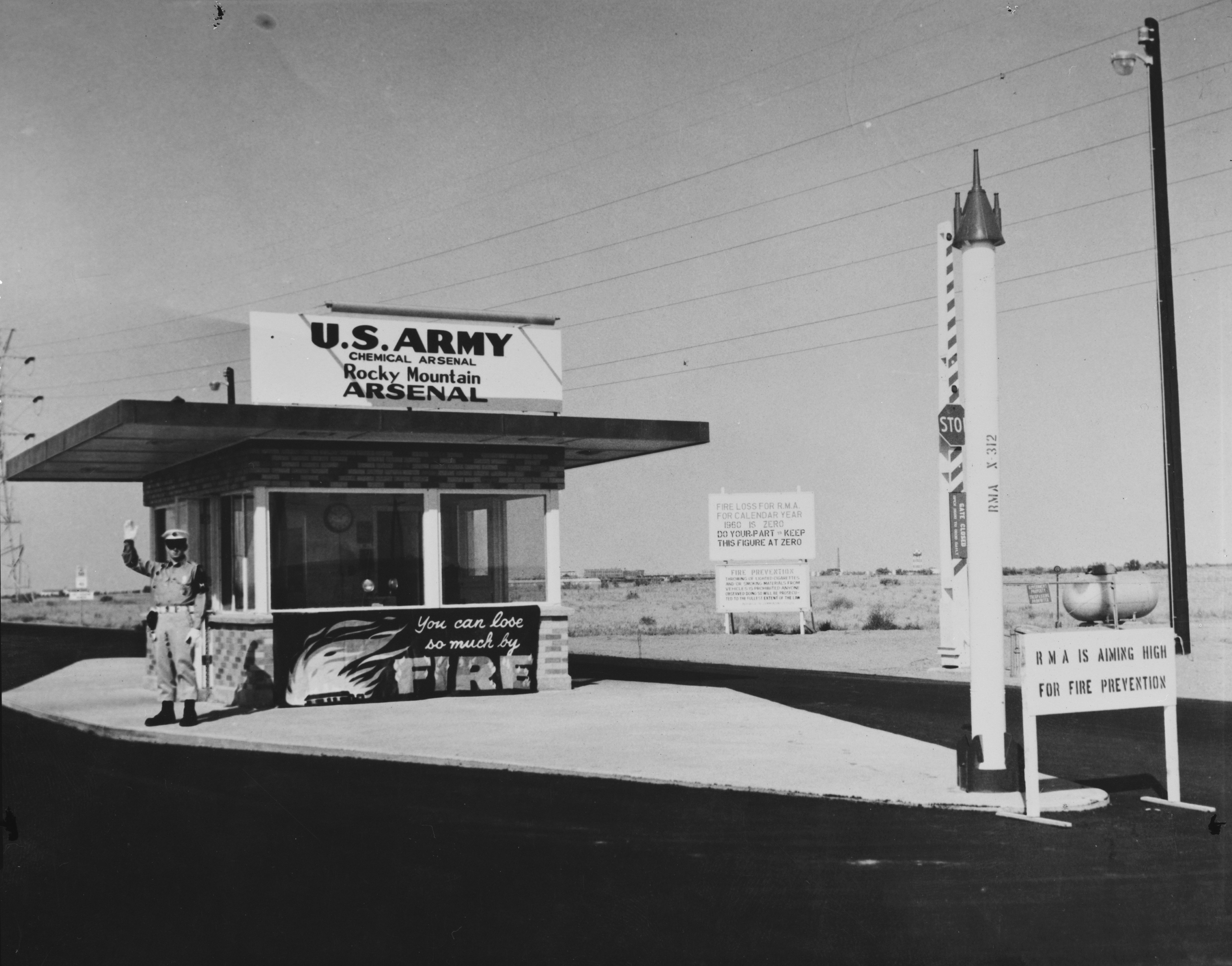
Rocky Mountain Arsenal, south entrance. (photo 1960)

The Rocky Mountain Arsenal was a United States chemical weapons manufacturing center located in the Denver Metropolitan Area in Commerce City, Colorado. The site was completed December 1942 and then operated by the United States Army throughout the latter 20th century, remaining controversial among local residents until its closure in 1992.

Much of the site is now protected as the Rocky Mountain Arsenal National Wildlife Refuge.

== History ==
After the attack on Pearl Harbor and the United States' entry into World War II, the U.S. Army began looking for land to create a chemical manufacturing center. Located just north of Denver, in Commerce City and close to the Stapleton Airport, the U.S. Army purchased 20,000 acres (81 km^{2}). The location was ideal, not only because of the proximity to the airport, but because of the geographic features of the site, it was less likely to be attacked. The Rocky Mountain Arsenal manufactured chemical weapons including mustard gas, napalm, white phosphorus, lewisite, chlorine gas, and sarin. In the early 1960s, the U.S. Army began to lease out its facilities to private companies to manufacture pesticides. In the early 1980s, the site was selected as a Superfund site and the cleanup process began. In the mid-1980s, wildlife, including endangered species, moved into the space. Later, the land was designated a protected wildlife refuge, partly open to the public.

=== Policy ===
The environmental movement began in the United States in the 1960-1970s. The U.S. Congress responded to the movement in 1980 with the creation of the Comprehensive Environmental Response, Compensation, and Liability Act (CERCLA), most commonly referred to as a Superfund. CERCLA was a tax imposed on chemical and petroleum industries. CERCLA also gave the Federal government the authority to respond to the release of life-threatening hazardous materials.

In 1984, after 42 years of chemical manufacturing, the United States Army began to inspect the level of contamination at Rocky Mountain Arsenal (RMA). The site was placed on the National Priorities List (NPL), a list of the most contaminated areas in the United States. Rocky Mountain Arsenal, among other post-military sites, was a top priority, establishing RMA as a Superfund site. This was further exacerbated when the U.S. Army discovered an endangered species, the bald eagle. After the bald eagles were captured, tested, and found to be healthy, the National Wildlife Federation (NWF) worked with policymakers to transition RMA to a wildlife refuge. In 1992, Congress passed the Rocky Mountain Arsenal National Wildlife Refuge Act (RMANWR Act). Included in the RMANWR Act, areas within RMA that were still contaminated were still owned by the U.S. Army, however, the vast majority of the land that was deemed clean would be managed by the U.S. Fish and Wildlife Service (USFWS or FWS).

Tensions arose between the United States Environmental Protection Agency (USEPA), the State of Colorado, United States Army, and the chemical industries as they partnered to clean up the site and create the RMANWR. This led the State of Colorado to take legal action over who has legal authority over RMA remediation efforts, payment of natural resource damages (NRDs), and reimbursement of costs expended for cleanup activities (response costs).

== Site selection ==
The Arsenal's location was selected due to its relative distance from the coasts (and presumably not likely to be attacked), a sufficient labor force to work at the site, weather that was conducive to outdoor work, and the appropriate soil needed for the project. It was also helpful that the location was close to Stapleton airfield, a major transportation hub.

In 1942, the US Army acquired 19,915 acres (80.59 km^{2}) of land on which to manufacture weapons in support of World War II military activities at a cost of $62,415,000. Additionally, some of this land was used for a prisoner of war camp (for German combatants) and later transferred to the city of Denver as Stapleton Airport expanded. A lateral was built off the High Line Canal to supply water to the Arsenal.

== Manufacturing operations ==
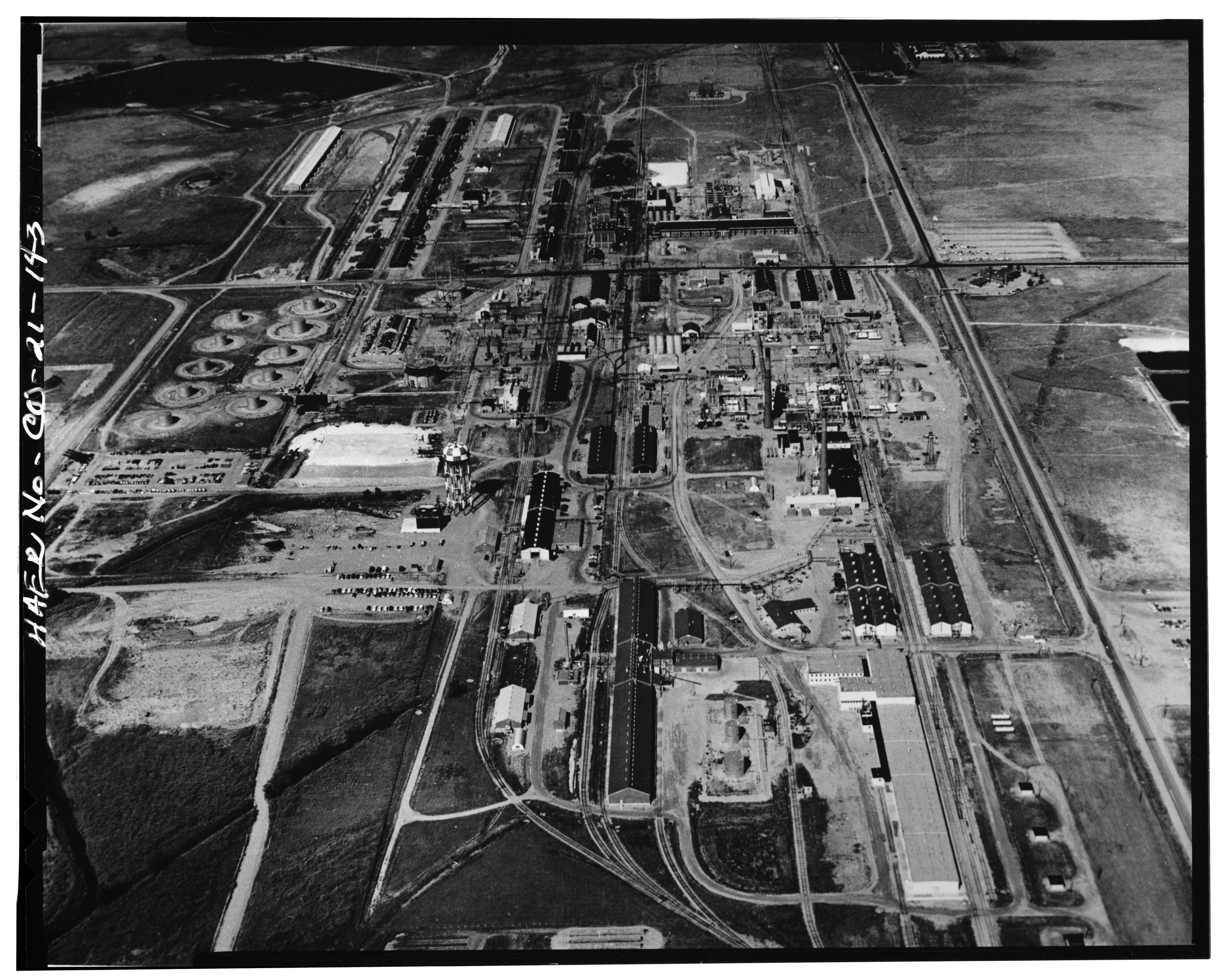
Rocky Mountain Arsenal, south plant. (photo 1970)

Weapons manufactured at RMA included both conventional and chemical munitions, including white phosphorus (M34 grenade), napalm, mustard gas, lewisite, and chlorine gas. RMA is also one of the few sites that had a stockpile of Sarin gas (aka nerve agent GB), an organophosphorus compound. The manufacturing of these weapons continued until 1969. Rocket fuel to support Air Force operations was also manufactured and stored at RMA. Subsequently, through the 1970s until 1985, RMA was used as a demilitarization site to destroy munitions and chemically related items. Coinciding with these activities, from 1946 to 1982, the Army leased RMA facilities to private industries for the production of pesticides. One of the major lessees, Shell Oil Company, along with Julius Hyman and Company and Colorado Fuel and Iron, had manufacturing and processing capabilities on RMA between 1952 and 1982. The military reserved the right to oust these companies and restart chemical weapon production in the event of a national emergency.

== Deep injection well ==
RMA contained a deep injection well that was constructed in 1961. It was drilled to a depth of 12,045 feet (3,671 m). The well was cased and sealed to a depth of 11,975 feet (3,650 m), with the remaining 70 feet (21 m) left as an open hole for the injection of Basin F liquids. For testing purposes, the well was injected with approximately 568,000 US gallons (2150 m³) of city water prior to injecting any waste. The injected fluids had very little potential for reaching the surface or usable groundwater supply since the injection point had 11,900 feet (3,600 m) of rock above it and was sealed at the opening. The Army discontinued use of the well in February 1966 because the fluid injection triggered a series of earthquakes in the area. The well remained unused until 1985 when the Army permanently sealed the disposal well.

== Environmental issues ==
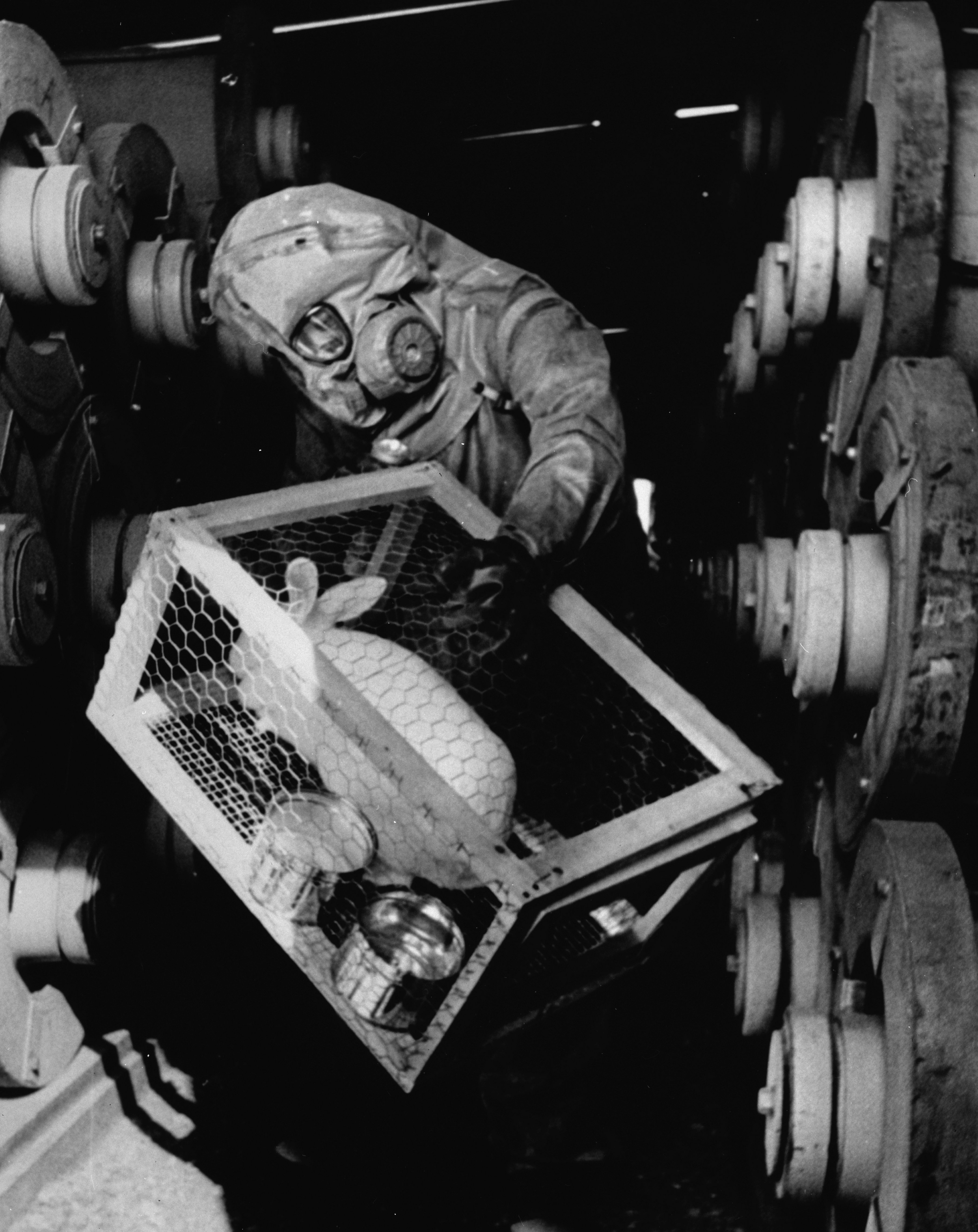
Rabbit used to check for leaks at Sarin nerve gas production plant. (photo 1970)

In 1984, the Army began a systematic investigation of site contamination in accordance with the Comprehensive Environmental Response, Compensation, and Liability Act of 1980 (CERCLA), commonly referred to as Superfund. In 1987, the RMA was placed on the National Priorities List (NPL) of Superfund sites. As provided by CERCLA, a Remedial Investigation/Feasibility Study (RI/FS) was conducted to determine the extent of contamination. Since 1985, the mission at RMA has been the remediation of the site.

=== Contaminants ===
The primary contaminants include organochloride pesticides, organophosphate pesticides, carbamate insecticides, organic solvents and feedstock chemicals used as raw products or intermediates in the manufacturing process (e.g., chlorinated benzenes), heavy metals, chemical warfare material and their related breakdown products and biological warfare agent such as TX. Additionally, ordnance (including incendiary munitions) was manufactured and tested, and asbestos and polychlorinated biphenyls (PCBs) were used at RMA. Today, it is considered a hazardous waste site according to the Colorado Department of Public Health and Environment (CDPHE).

=== Groundwater contamination ===
The contamination of the underlying alluvial aquifer occurred due to the discharge of waste into unlined basins. The following data were derived from the United States Nuclear Regulatory Commission (NRC). From 1943 to 1956, the US Army and Shell discharged wastes into the unlined basins resulting in the contamination of the South Platte River outside the Arsenal. Farmers in the vicinity complained about the damage to crops due to the water pumped from the shallow alluvial aquifer. In response, the Army constructed an asphalt-lined impoundment for the disposal of wastes in 1956. Further, in 1961, the Army constructed a 12,000-foot deep injection well for the disposal of wastes. This resulted in subsequent earthquakes in Denver area. In 1975, Colorado Department of Public Health and Environment ordered the Army and Shell to stop the non-permitted discharge of contaminants, to control the contaminated groundwater leaving the site, and to implement a monitoring plan. The Army and Shell took remedial actions to prevent the contamination that includes the installation of the groundwater barrier system which treated approximately 1 billion gallons of water every year. The deep injection well was closed in 1985 and Basin F was closed in 1988 According to a National Resource Damage Assessment (NRDA), although the contamination has been reduced by the treatment efforts, the water in and around the arsenal may never be fully clean. A volume of approximately 52,500 acre-feet (65 million cubic metres) of the alluvial aquifer is not usable for human consumption.

=== Wildlife Injuries ===
The NRDA found several injuries to wildlife. It was estimated by the U.S. Fish and Wildlife Service that at least 20,000 ducks died in a 10-year span during the 1970s. Mallard carcasses found to have higher levels of Dieldrin. Many mammals and birds were found dead and may have suffered lower reproduction rates or birth defects.

== Safety concerns for neighboring residents ==
Because of the Superfund site status and the dramatic cleanups, many residents in neighborhoods surrounding the RMA voiced concern about ongoing health risks of living within the close vicinity of the site. In September 2017, the state of Colorado filed a lawsuit to sue the United States government for the right to control the contaminated areas of the RMA. Though the cleanup of the site was considered complete in 2010, soil and groundwater monitoring practices occur every five years to ensure the effects of the clean-up remain. Restrictions on well water use, residential development, consumption of fish and game from the arsenal, and agricultural use of the arsenal will exist in perpetuity until further scientific research is completed at the site.

=== Water ===
Many of the surrounding neighborhoods have been provided with potable tap water from other areas of Adams County because of the potential effects of contaminated groundwater from wells.

The carcinogenic chemical 1,4-dioxane has been found in nearby private groundwater wells and, in trace amounts, in source water wells for the area. The contamination has been confirmed by the county as sourcing from the RMA Superfund. The average concentration of 1,4-dioxane in district drinking water is well below the EPA health advisory level (0.71 parts per billion as of 2025, versus an EPA health advisory level of 35 parts per billion).

=== Soil ===
As part of the clean up of the RMA, much of the soil, up to 10 feet below the surface was removed from the site. This soil is contained in hazardous waste landfills. Contaminated areas of soil remain in the Rocky Mountain Arsenal, but are contained in basins and containment structures.

=== Air quality ===
During the cleanup of the RMA, concern for air pollution from the hazardous materials was raised. The Colorado Department of Public Health and Environment established monitoring systems throughout various locations of the RMA. Throughout the decades of cleanup, the air monitors revealed there was no safety hazard to public health as no arsenal chemicals had been released into the air.

=== Epidemiological studies ===
Longstanding agricultural and health concerns related to the Rocky Mountain Arsenal have resulted in a complex history of political and legal battles. Heavy volatile contaminants related to Basin F raised concern among the public for the site and the process of the clean-up itself of the Arsenal and a medical monitoring program (MMP) was put in place as part of the Record of Decision (ROD) between the U.S. Army, the U.S. Environmental Protection Agency, and the Colorado Department of Health and Environment in 1996. One of the goals of the MMP was to enhance community assurance that the clean-up was effective, and it included air quality monitoring, cancer surveillance, and birth defects surveillance. Air quality monitoring of the Arsenal began concurrently with the decontamination process in 1997 and surveillance continued until July 2009.

The Surveillance for Birth Defects utilized passive observational data from an existing birth defects registry March 1989 – March 2009. The following data were derived from the Rocky Mountain Arsenal Medical Monitoring Program Surveillance for Birth Defects Compendium prepared by Colorado Department of Public Health and Environment and published in February 2010. In this study, baseline birth defects were estimated from the time period 1989–1997, which was the point at which the clean-up began, and inclusion criteria included mother's address at the time of birth being within the geographical study area. Other demographics of the mother were gathered as well. Birth defects included in the analysis were: "total congenital anomalies, major congenital anomalies, heart defects, muscle and skeletal defects, and kidney and bladder defects," and these categories were inconsistent in reporting accuracy. Statistically significant findings (p<0.01) of this study included demographic differences in the mothers as follows: median age 24, compared to 27 years of age in Colorado as a whole, higher percent of mothers who were white/Hispanic and black, mean education level of 11.8 years compared to 13.1 years in Colorado as a whole, fewer mothers who were married, and fewer prenatal visits on average. These potential confounders are not clearly addressed in this report and may complicate the analysis as well as raise concern for disparities in exposure risk that is dependent upon demographic factors. Baseline rates of congenital anomalies in the study area compared to Colorado as a whole did not show significant differences between populations. No significant increase was observed in congenital anomalies during the clean-up period compared to pre-clean up, although there are no baseline data prior to initial contamination events because data was not yet being collected and the population was very different at that time.

In summary, there is no current evidence of health effects. The Colorado Department of Public Health and Environment found no increased risk of birth defects in infants. A separate study of cancer incidence by the Colorado Department of Health did not find convincing evidence of increased cancer risk in people living in residential areas surrounding the arsenal, although the study was made more difficult by the large demographic changes in the area and was also confounded by smoking and obesity rates. Additionally, studies performed at Colorado State University found no increased risk of Arsenic, Mercury, or neurotoxicity in communities within 15 miles of the RMA.

== Economic impact of contamination and clean up ==
Many projects have attempted to clean contaminated groundwater at the Arsenal. For example, DIMP (diisopropyl methyl phosphonate) was one of the main contaminants in the area. One monitoring project has demonstrated incremental improvements over time, and specifically measured 640 parts per billion (ppb) in 1987 and 55 ppb in 1989, while a different off-post monitoring well measured 138 ppb in 1985, 105 ppb in 1987, 14 ppb in 1988, and 6.7 ppb in 1989. While it is difficult to capture the societal cost to clean up the site, the list of actions dealing with groundwater contamination listed by Mears and Heise include:

- North boundary groundwater treatment system (1979–82) – $4.3 million
- Irondale groundwater treatment system by Shell (1981) – $1.1 million
- Basin F liquid evaporation and contaminated sewer removal (1982) – $1.5 million
- Northwest boundary groundwater treatment system (1984) – $5.5 million
- Deep well closure (1986) – $2.5 million
- Removal of 76,000 drums of waste salts (1986) – $10.5 million
- Treatment in the public water supply and The Klein Water Treatment Facility supplies safe drinking water to 30,000 south Adams County residents (1989) – $23.1 million
- Removal and containment of 10.5M gallons of Basin F liquids and 564,000 cubic yards of sludges (1989) – $42 million
- Improvements and modifications to North boundary system (1990–1) – $2.75 million
- Closure of 353 abandoned wells on-post (1990) – $3.7 million
- Basin F groundwater intercept system (1990) – $0.7 million
- Basin A neck groundwater treatment system (1990) – $3.1 million
- Northwest Boundary System Improvement (1991) – $1.4 million
- Rail classification yard and motor pool ground water (1991) – $3.0 million
- South tank farm plume (1991) – $0.5 million
- Army trenches (1991) – $1.4 million
- Shell trenches (1991) – $3.2 million
- Reapplication of windblown dust control (1991) – $0.25 million
- Groundwater treatment system to the north (1992–3) – $8.7 million
- Building 1727 sump cleanup (1993) – $0.18 million

Direct economic totals add up to approximately $111 million and this estimation does not include operation and maintenance costs. In addition, there were actions completed by Future Farmers of America (FFA) between 1991 and 1993 that cost approximately $151.2 million. A more recent article in 2004 by Pimentel, estimated the cost of removal pesticides from the groundwater and soil at the Rocky Mountain Arsenal by approximately $2 billion. Also, they noted that if all groundwater were to be cleared for human consumption, the cost would be $500 million annually.

Estimating exact direct and indirect impact of the contamination is very challenging as the cleaning and monitoring costs are complex. Further, there have been damages to the rural areas due to contamination resulting in livestock losses, and crop losses. In addition, contamination affects public health and nature (honeybee poisonings, pesticide resistance in pests, destruction of natural predators, wild birds, microbes) negatively. There are many studies that try to estimate the total costs due to contamination of pesticides in U.S. as well as in other countries; however, indirect costs are difficult to estimate, but likely several times than total direct environmental and social costs. In the case of Rocky Mountain Arsenal, total indirect cost was not estimated at all.

== Rocky Mountain Arsenal NWR Act ==
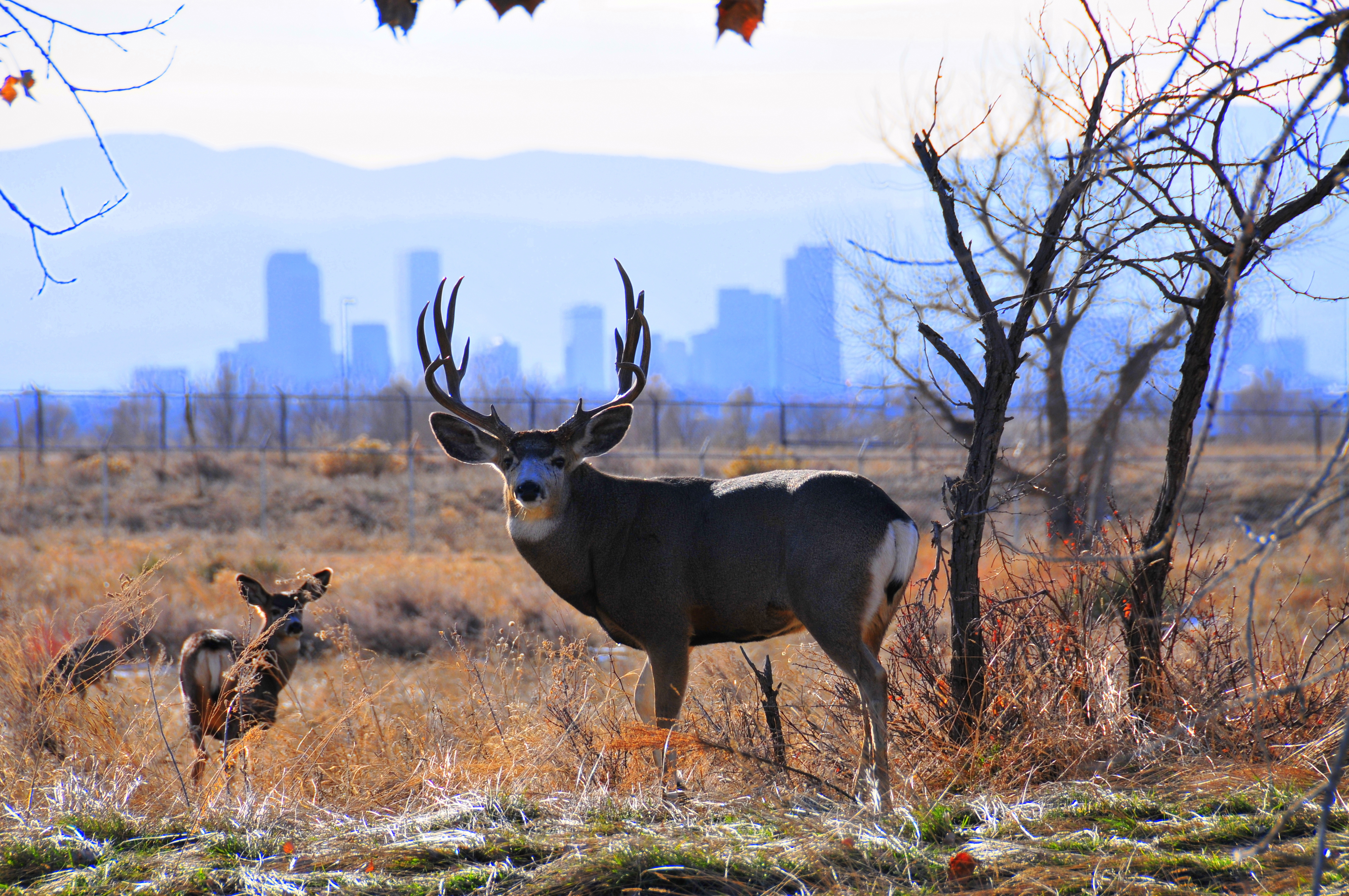
Mule deer at the Rocky Mountain Arsenal National Wildlife Refuge with Denver, CO and the Rocky Mountain foothills in the background. (photo 2009)

In 1986, it was discovered that the absence of human activity had made the area an involuntary park when a winter communal roost of bald eagles, then an endangered species, was discovered on site. The U.S. Fish and Wildlife Service inventoried more than 330 species of wildlife that inhabit the Arsenal including deer, coyotes, white pelicans, and owls.

The Rocky Mountain Arsenal National Wildlife Refuge Act was passed in October 1992 and signed by President George H. W. Bush. It stipulates that the majority of the site will become a National Wildlife Refuge under the jurisdiction of the Fish and Wildlife Service when the environmental restoration is completed. The act also provides that to the extent possible, parts of the arsenal are to be managed as a refuge in the interim. Finally, the act provides for the transfer of some arsenal land for road expansion around the perimeter of the arsenal and 915 acres (3.70 km^{2}) to be sold for development and annexation by Commerce City.

Already since 1995, the buildings became the seat of the National Eagle Repository, an office of the Fish and Wildlife Service that receives the bodies of all dead golden and bald eagles in the nation and provides feathers and other parts to Native Americans for cultural uses.

In September 2010, the cleanup was considered complete, and the remaining portions of land were transferred to the U.S. Fish and Wildlife Service, bringing the total to 15,000 acres (61 km^{2}). Two sites were retained by the Army: the South Plants location due to historical use, and the North Plant location, which is now a landfill containing the remains of various buildings used in the plants.

On May 21, 2011, the official visitor center for the refuge was opened with an exhibit about the site's history, ranging from the homesteading era to its current status.

=== Public use ===
Congruent with the outline of the June 1996 USFWS Comprehensive Management Plan, RMA will be available for public use through both community outreach and educational programs (as provided by the Visitor Access Plan and the USFWS). This public availability will be implemented while simultaneously supporting the remediation effort and the USFWS activities.

=== Dick's Sporting Goods Park ===
In April 2007 Dick's Sporting Goods Park, a soccer-specific stadium, was opened on part of the former Rocky Mountain Arsenal land that was transferred to Commerce City. The new venue hosts the Colorado Rapids of Major League Soccer.

=== Bison ===
A small herd of wild bison was introduced to the refuge in March 2007 as part of the USFWS Bison Project. The animals were transferred from the National Bison Range in Montana.

== See also ==
- United States chemical weapons program
