= McLaughlin v. United States =

- Supreme Court of the United States

Argued March 31, 1986 Decided April 29, 1986
- Full case name: Lamont Julius McLaughlin, Petitioner v. United States
- Citations: 476 U.S. 16 (more) 106 S. Ct. 1677; 90 L. Ed. 2d 15; 1986 U.S. LEXIS 146

Holding
- An unloaded handgun is a “dangerous weapon” within the meaning of federal bank robbery laws.

Court membership
- Chief Justice Warren E. Burger Associate Justices William J. Brennan Jr. · Byron White; Thurgood Marshall · Harry Blackmun; Lewis F. Powell Jr. · William Rehnquist; John P. Stevens · Sandra Day O'Connor

Case opinion
- Majority: Stevens, joined by unanimous

Laws applied
- 18 U.S.C. § 2113

McLaughlin v. United States, 476 U.S. 16 (1986), was a United States Supreme Court case in which the Court unanimously held that an unloaded handgun is a “dangerous weapon” within the meaning of federal bank robbery laws. Justice John Paul Stevens' brief four-paragraph opinion in McLaughlin has been described by some analysts as "the shortest opinion by the Court in decades."

== Background ==
=== Federal bank robbery laws ===
Federal bank robbery statutes provide enhanced penalties for assaults that occur through the use of a “dangerous weapon” during a bank robbery. Over time, a circuit split emerged where some courts ruled that a gun must be "loaded and operable" to qualify as a "dangerous weapon," while other courts held that an unloaded gun could qualify as a "dangerous weapon." The Supreme Court of the United States granted review in McLaughlin v. United States to resolve this circuit split.

=== Arrest and trial of Lamont Julius McLaughlin ===
At approximately 9:30 a.m. on July 26, 1984 Lamont Julius McLaughlin and a companion entered a bank in Baltimore, Maryland wearing stocking masks and gloves. McLaughlin "displayed a dark handgun" and ordered patrons to put their hands up. McLaughlin's companion then jumped over the counter and placed approximately $3,400 in a brown paper bag. When McLaughlin and his companion attempted to leave the bank, they were immediately apprehended by police. Officers seized McLaughlin's gun, but discovered it was not loaded. At trial, McLaughlin pleaded guilty to charges of bank robbery and bank larceny. He was also found guilt of assault during a bank robbery “by the use of a dangerous weapon" based on the district court's determination that the unloaded gun was a "dangerous weapon" within the meaning of federal bank robbery statutes. On appeal, the United States Court of Appeals for the Fourth Circuit affirmed McLaughlin's conviction. McLaughlin appealed again to the Supreme Court of the United States, which granted certiorari on November 4, 1985.

== Opinion of the Court ==
Writing for a unanimous court, Justice John Paul Stevens provided three reasons why an unloaded gun is a "dangerous weapon" under the federal bank robbery statute. First, Justice Stevens argued that "the law reasonably may presume that such an article is always dangerous even though it may not be armed at a particular time or place." Second, he argued that "the display of a gun instills fear in the average citizen," even if it is not loaded, and "creates an immediate danger that a violent response will ensue." Third, he argued that an unloaded gun "can cause harm when used as a bludgeon."

== See also ==
- List of United States Supreme Court cases
- List of United States Supreme Court cases, volume 476
