= South Carolina v. Catawba Indian Tribe, Inc. =

- Supreme Court of the United States

Argued December 12, 1985 Decided June 2, 1986
- Full case name: South Carolina v. Catawba Indian Tribe, Inc.
- Docket no.: 84-782
- Citations: 476 U.S. 498 (more) 106 S. Ct. 2039; 90 L. Ed. 2d 490, 54 U.S.L.W. 4544

Case history
- Prior: 718 F.2d 1291 (4th Cir. 1983), affirmed on rehearing, 740 F.2d 305 (4th Cir. 1984) (en banc); cert. granted, 471 U.S. 1134 (1985)
- Subsequent: On remand, 865 F.2d 1444 (4th Cir. 1989) (en banc); cert. denied, 491 U.S. 906 (1989); mandamus denied after remand sub nom. In re Catawba Indian Tribe of S.C., No. 89-2831 (4th Cir. 1990) (en banc); aff'd in part, rev'd in part, vacated and remanded, 978 F.2d 1334 (4th Cir. 1992) (en banc); cert. denied, 507 U.S. 972 (1993); mandamus denied after remand sub nom. In re Catawba Indian Tribe of S.C., 973 F.2d 1133 (4th Cir. 1992) (en banc).

Holding
- State statutes of limitations apply to the land claims of terminated tribes

Court membership
- Chief Justice Warren E. Burger Associate Justices William J. Brennan Jr. · Byron White; Thurgood Marshall · Harry Blackmun; Lewis F. Powell Jr. · William Rehnquist; John P. Stevens · Sandra Day O'Connor

Case opinions
- Majority: Stevens, joined by Burger, Brennan, White, Powell, Rehnquist
- Dissent: Blackmun, joined by Marshall, O'Connor

Laws applied
- Treaty of Fort Augusta; 25 U.S.C. §§ 931—938 (termination act); Nonintercourse Act

South Carolina v. Catawba Indian Tribe, Inc., 476 U.S. 498 (1986), is an important U.S. Supreme Court precedent for aboriginal title in the United States decided in the wake of County of Oneida v. Oneida Indian Nation of New York State (Oneida II) (1985). Distinguishing Oneida II, the Court held that federal policy did not preclude the application of a state statute of limitations to the land claim of a tribe that had been terminated, such as the Catawba tribe.

The Court remanded to the United States Court of Appeals for the Fourth Circuit to determine whether South Carolina's statute of limitations applied to the facts of the case. All together, the Fourth Circuit heard oral arguments in the case seven times, six of those times sitting en banc, i.e. all the judges on the Circuit rather than a panel of three (although the Circuit wrote only five published opinions). The Fourth Circuit determined that the limitations statute only barred the claim against those defendants that could satisfy the standards of adverse possession and upheld the trial court's denial of a defendant class certification.

These rulings would have required the Catawbas to file individual lawsuits against the estimated 60,000 landowners in the area. The complaints were prepared and printed, but the parties reached a settlement before the date on which the Catawbas would have been required to file the individual complaints. Congress ratified the settlement, extinguishing all aboriginal title held by the Catawbas in exchange for $50,000,000—$32,000,000 paid by the federal government and $18,000,000 paid by the state.

== Background ==
The Treaty of Fort Augusta (1763), which immediately followed the Royal Proclamation of 1763, between the Catawba and the King of England guaranteed 144,000 acres (58,000 ha) of land to the Catawba in modern-day northern South Carolina. The "Tract of Land of Fifteen Miles square" was the Catawba's sole reservation, having ceded to the British the entirety of the rest of their claim to North and South Carolina in 1760 and 1763.

By 1840, nearly all of the Catawba reservation had been leased to non-Indians. After the Revolution, and decades after the passage of the federal Nonintercourse Act requiring Congressional consent for conveyances of Indian lands, South Carolina purchased 144,000-acre tract in 1840 with the Treaty of Nation Ford, without federal involvement. The Treaty provided that the tribe should receive $5,000 ($161,250 in 2025) worth of land, $2,500 ($80,625 in 2025), and nine annual payments of $1,500 ($48,375 in 2025). In 1842, the state purchased a 630-acre (250 ha) reservation for the tribe, which was still held in trust by the state for the tribe at the time of litigation.

Between 1900 and 1942, the tribe lobbied the state to resolve the dispute. The tribe also lobbied the federal government; for example, in 1910 a federal Indian agent advised the tribe the federal government would not litigate the tribe's claim on their behalf. In 1943, the tribe, state, and Bureau of Indian Affairs (BIA) entered into a Memorandum of Understanding whereby the state purchased 3,434 acres (1,390 ha) for the tribe and conveyed the land to the Department of Interior in trust for the tribe; the agreement did not require the Catawba to renounce their claim against the state. Under the agreement, the tribe also adopted a BIA-approved constitution and received federal benefits.

In 1959, pursuant to federal Indian termination policy, Congress authorized the division of the Catawba tribe's assets pursuant to the Catawba Division of Assets Act (the "termination act"). The BIA reassured the tribe that termination would not jeopardize the tribe's claim against the state. The termination act provided that all state laws would apply to the tribe as if they were non-Indians.

In 1975, the Catawbas incorporated under South Carolina law as a non-profit. By the time of the lawsuit, the town of Rock Hill, South Carolina had developed within the former 144,000-acre tract.

== Prior history ==
=== District Court ===
In 1980, the Catawba sued the state of South Carolina and 76 public and private land-owning entities, as named representatives of a defendant class estimated at 27,000 persons. The tribe contended that the Treaty of Nation Ford was void because of the federal Nonintercourse Act and because the state had not lived up to its obligations (by delaying the purchase for 2.5 years, by spending only $2,000 on the new reservation, and buying land for the new reservation from within the old reservation). The tribe sought both possession of the lands and 140 years of trespass damages. The Catawba were represented by the Native American Rights Fund (NARF).

All members of the United States District Court for the District of South Carolina recused themselves from the case. Therefore, Judge Joseph Putnam Willson of the United States District Court for the Western District of Pennsylvania was designated to try the case by Chief Justice Burger. Wilson decided to resolve the merits before reaching the plaintiff's motion to certify the defendant class. Wilson granted summary judgement to the defendants.

=== Fourth Circuit ===
The United States Court of Appeals for the Fourth Circuit reversed. The Circuit reheard the case en banc with the same result. The Fourth Circuit interpreted the termination act to apply only to the tribal members, not the tribe itself.

The Supreme Court granted certiorari and the United States Solicitor General joined the defendants at oral argument.

== Opinion ==
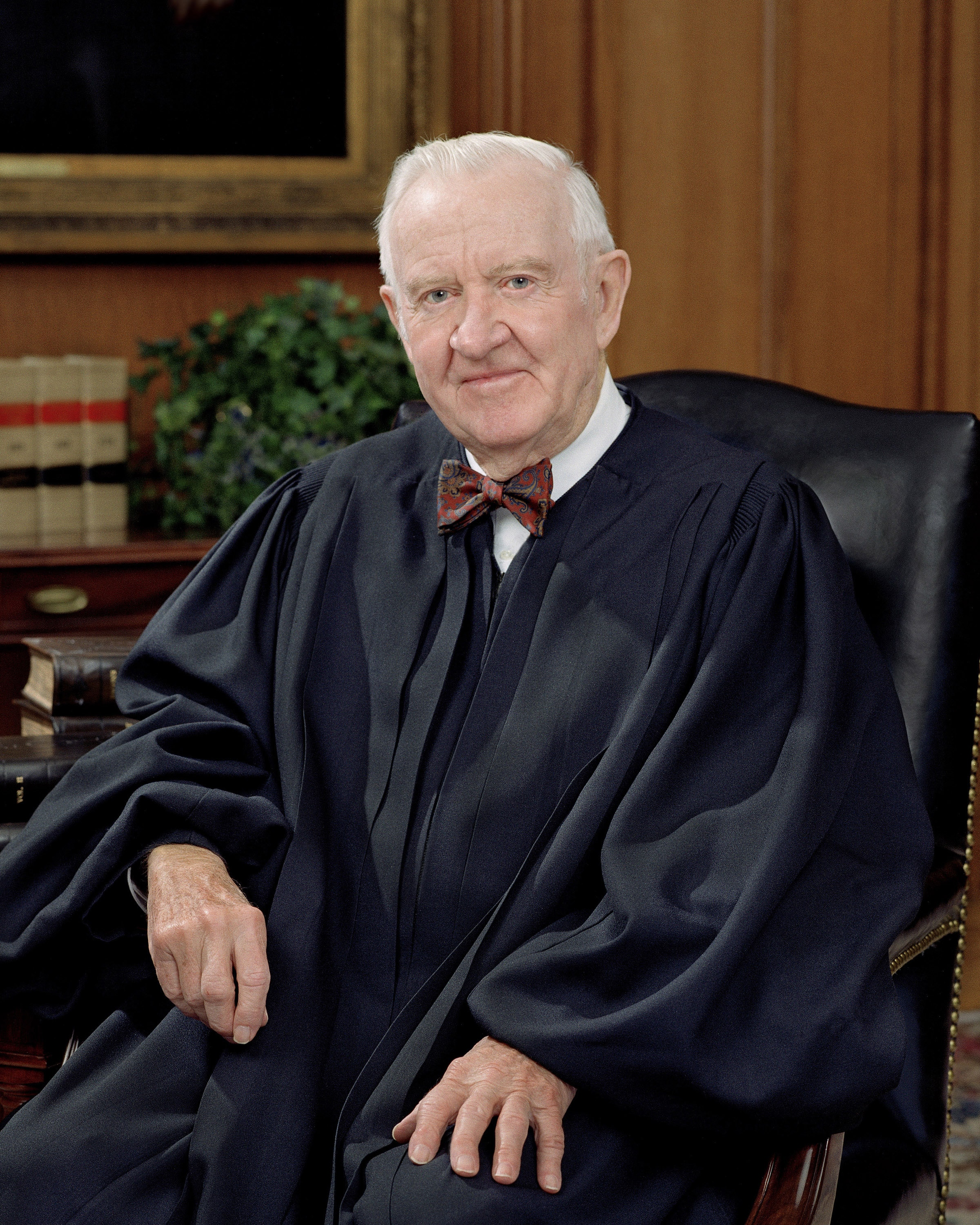
Justice John Paul Stevens held that the termination act triggered a state statute of limitations.

=== Majority ===
Justice John Paul Stevens, for a majority of six, held that the South Carolina statute of limitations applied to the Catawba's claim, but did not reach the issue of whether it barred the tribe's claim.

The Court rejected the Fourth Circuit's interpretation of the termination act, stating: "The canon of construction regarding the resolution of ambiguities in favor of Indians, however, does not permit reliance on ambiguities that do not exist; nor does it permit disregard of the clearly expressed intent of Congress." Thus, having concluded that the tribe itself was terminated, the Court held that the statute of limitations should apply:

Without special federal protection for the Tribe, the state statute of limitations should apply to its claim in this case. For it is well established that federal claims are subject to state statutes of limitations unless there is a federal statute of limitations or a conflict with federal policy. Although federal policy may preclude the ordinary applicability of a state statute of limitations for this type of action in the absence of a specific congressional enactment to the contrary, the Catawba Act clearly suffices to reestablish the usual principle regarding the applicability of the state statute of limitations. In striking contrast to the situation in [Oneida II], the Catawba Act represents an explicit redefinition of the relationship between the Federal Government and the Catawbas; an intentional termination of the special federal protection for the Tribe and its members; and a plain statement that state law applies to the Catawbas as to all “other persons or citizens.”

As for the BIA's assurance, the Court that only meant that the termination act did not terminate the claim, not that the statute of limitations would not begin to run. Because the Court of Appeals had only held that the statute of limitation did not apply, not that it would not bar the claim if it applied, and the district court had held the claim barred, the Court remanded to the Court of Appeals to pass on that conclusion of the district court.

=== Dissent ===
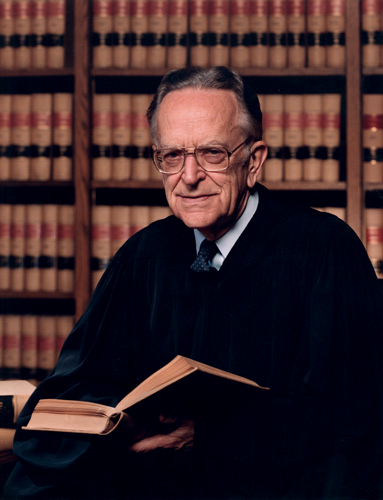
Justice Harry Blackmun would have interpreted the termination act to apply only to the individual Catawbas, not the tribe, and not to undo the common law restraint on alienation.

Justice Harry Blackmun, joined by Justices Sandra Day O'Connor and Thurgood Marshall dissented.

Noting that the Catawba's claims arose from the federal Constitution, federal treaties, and a federal statute, the dissent argued: "These are federal claims and the statute of limitations is thus a matter of federal law. Where, as here, Congress has not specified a statute of limitations, federal courts generally borrow the most closely analogous limitations period under state law, but only if application of the state limitations period would not frustrate federal policy." In determining whether federal policy would bar the borrowing of the state statute of limitations—as it had in Oneida II—the dissent would have relied on the Indian law canon of construction. To this end, the dissent noted:

This rule is not simply a method of breaking ties; it reflects an altogether proper reluctance by the judiciary to assume that Congress has chosen further to disadvantage a people whom our Nation long ago reduced to a state of dependency. The rule is particularly appropriate when the statute in question was passed primarily for the benefit of the Indians, as was the 1959 Division of Assets Act. Absent “clear and plain” language to the contrary, it must be assumed that Congress did not intend to belie its “avowed solicitude” for the Indians with a “backhanded” abrogation or limitation of their rights.

The dissent did not find the statute as clear as the majority did. Moreover, the dissent argued that the termination statute undid only the statutory restraint on alienation (the Nonintercourse Act), not the common law restraint on alienation:

[E]ven if I agreed with the majority that the removal of restraints on alienation should trigger the application of state limitations periods, the 1959 Act lifted only statutory restrictions on the alienation of Catawba land, and the requirement that the Federal Government approve any transfer of the property at issue in this case did not, and does not, stem solely from any federal statute. The land set aside for the Catawbas in 1760 and 1763 was within the Tribe's aboriginal territory, and their claim to the land thus derives from original title as well as from the 18th-century treaties. With respect to original title, at least, the Nonintercourse Act merely “put in statutory form what was or came to be the accepted rule-that the extinguishment of Indian title required the consent of the United States.”

In a footnote, the dissent further noted that:

The federal common-law rule against alienation of aboriginal title without the consent of the sovereign was recognized as early as [Johnson v. McIntosh (1823)], and it is reflected in the Constitution's Indian Commerce Clause . . . . In Oneida II, the Court rejected a suggestion that Indian common-law rights to tribal lands were somehow swallowed up or pre-empted by the Nonintercourse Act; it made clear that the common law still furnishes an independent basis for legal relief.

The dissent also rejected the suggestion by the majority that the tribe's gradual assimilation weakened its claim:

When an Indian Tribe has been assimilated and dispersed to this extent-and when, as the majority points out, thousands of people now claim interests in the Tribe's ancestral homeland, the Tribe's claim to that land may seem ethereal, and the manner of the Tribe's dispossession may seem of no more than historical interest. But the demands of justice do not cease simply because a wronged people grow less distinctive, or because the rights of innocent third parties must be taken into account in fashioning a remedy. Today's decision seriously handicaps the Catawbas' effort to obtain even partial redress for the illegal expropriation of lands twice pledged to them, and it does so by attributing to Congress, in effect, an unarticulated intent to trick the Indians a century after the property changed hands. From any perspective, there is little to be proud of here.

Finally, the dissent repeated Justice Black's famous Tuscarora rule: "[g]reat nations, like great men, should keep their word."

== Subsequent history ==
On remand, the defendants attempted to certify the question of whether the state statute of limitations barred the claim to the South Carolina Supreme Court; in September 1987, a mere three weeks after receiving the request, the South Carolina Supreme Court returned the question unanswered.

Certification having been declined, the Fourth Circuit, again en banc, held 4–2 that the statute of limitations did not bar the tribe's claim, finding that there was a presumption of possession within the 10 year limitations period. In other words, the court held that the Catawba's claim would only be time-barred as to defendants who were able to demonstrate adverse possession, without tacking except by inheritance. Thus, the court would look for a continuous ten-year period of possession for each defendant land-owner for the period between July 12, 1962 (the date of termination) and October 28, 1980 (the filing of the complaint). Further, the court rejected the defendant's other affirmative defense that the claim was not recorded in South Carolina's Registry of Mesne Conveyances and challenge to the jurisdiction of the court. The U.S. Supreme Court declined to grant certiorari after this ruling.

On remand, the district court (still Judge Wilson) decided to complete the resolution of the limitations issue before reaching the issue of whether to certify the defendant class. This caused the plaintiffs to apply to the Fourth Circuit for mandamus (an order compelling the district judge to certify the class), which the Fourth Circuit (still en banc) unanimously denied. Thereafter, the district court—after soliciting dozens of affidavits to show adverse possession, as articulated by the Fourth Circuit—granted summary judgement to many of the landowner-defendants and the Fourth Circuit (still en banc) affirmed in part and reversed in part, and vacated and remanded. Again, the Circuit permitted tacking where the transfer was by operation of law or by will. The U.S. Supreme Court declined certiorari to review this decision.

Again on remand, the district court denied certification, arguing that each land-owner's defense of adverse possession would require individual factual determinations. Because Judge Wilson again refused to certify the question for appeal, the Catawba again sought mandamus, which the Fourth Circuit (en banc) denied. On the mandamus appeal, the Fourth Circuit declined to resolve the issue of whether the statute of limitations was tolled against the non-named defendant class members.

Thus, the Catawba prepared to file 60,000 separate complaints against individual landowners in the time remaining before October 1992 (the Catawba's interpretation of when the, even tolled, limitations period would run). The complaints were drafted and printed, and if filed, "would have been the largest single filing of separate complaints in the history of the federal court system."

== Parallel Claims Court case ==
The Catawba also sued the federal government in the United States Claims Court on the theory that the BIA had misrepresented the effect that the termination act would have on tribe's land claim. The Claims Court dismissed this action on both the statute of limitations in the Indian Claims Commission Act and the Claims Court's own statute of limitations in 1991. The United States Court of Appeals for the Federal Circuit affirmed in 1993, and the Supreme Court denied certiorari that year.

== Settlement ==
In August 1992, Congress enacted legislation by voice vote to toll the Catawba's statute of limitation for one year, in order to increase the time to negotiate a settlement. A settlement was negotiated wherein the Catawba's aboriginal title would be extinguished in exchange for $50,000,000. Legislation approving the settlement (as is required for any settlement extinguishing aboriginal title) was passed in August 1993, soon after Congress passed President Bill Clinton's omnibus budget legislation. In addition, the settlement act repealed the Catawba termination act. The tribe voted to approve the settlement.

According to Christie: "The inherently complex nature of a claim such as this as well as the hardships caused by all concerned during its protracted existence vividly demonstrate that litigation is an unfortunate vehicle by which to resolve essentially political Indian land-claim issues and that a legislative settlement by Congress such as the one ultimately reached is preferable."
