= City of Los Angeles v. Preferred Communications, Inc. =

- Supreme Court of the United States

Argued April 29, 1986 Decided June 2, 1986
- Full case name: City of Los Angeles and Department of Water and Power v. Preferred Communications, Inc.
- Citations: 476 U.S. 488 (more)
- Argument: Oral argument
- Opinion announcement: Opinion announcement

Case history
- Prior: 754 F.2d 1396 (9th Cir. 1985)
- Subsequent: 13 F.3d 1327 (9th Cir. 1994)

Holding
- Case remanded to lower court to determine the legal extent of restricting cable franchising

Court membership
- Chief Justice Warren E. Burger Associate Justices William J. Brennan Jr. · Byron White; Thurgood Marshall · Harry Blackmun; Lewis F. Powell Jr. · William Rehnquist; John P. Stevens · Sandra Day O'Connor

Case opinions
- Majority: Rehnquist, joined by Burger, Brennan, White, Powell, Stevens
- Concurrence: Blackmun, joined by Marshall and O'Connor

Laws applied
- First Amendment

City of Los Angeles v. Preferred Communications, Inc., 476 U.S. 488 (1986), is a United States Supreme Court case dealing with the First Amendment to the United States Constitution and the extent of discretion given to cable franchises to challenge restrictions on First Amendment grounds. The Court affirmed the decision of the United States Court of Appeals for the Ninth Circuit and remanded the case to the United States District Court for the Central District of California, holding that:

...where the city has made factual assertions to justify restrictions on cable television franchising and these assertions are disputed by respondent, there must be a fuller development of the disputed factual issues before this Court will decide the legal issues.

== Background ==
In 1983, the City of Los Angeles denied a franchise and license, including the opportunity to compete for one, to Preferred Communications, Inc., a firm founded by businessmen Carl and Clinton Galloway as Universal Cable Systems, Inc.

Preferred Communications, Inc. responded by filing suit against the city in the United States District Court for the Central District of California, seeking redress for the violation of its First Amendment right to free speech.

The District Court dismissed the federal claims made by Preferred Communication, Inc. without leave to amend.

Preferred Communications, Inc. appealed to the United States Court of Appeals for the Ninth Circuit, which reversed the District Court's decision with respect to the First Amendment argument, but affirmed its dismissal of the Anti Trust allegations made against city officials on the grounds that such officials possessed state immunity or qualified immunity. Subsequent to this reversal, the city appealed to the Supreme Court, which affirmed the court of appeals saying "The complaint should not have been dismissed. The activities which respondent seeks to engage in plainly implicates first amendment interests" and, that "Taking the allegations in the complaint as true, ... the well-pleaded facts of the complaint constitute a cognizable [first amendment violation.]"

The district court dismissed the case for failure to state a claim upon which relief can be granted, meaning that the factual allegations in the complaint, if true, would not give Preferred Communications a right to relief from the city.

The case originated in United States District Court for the Central District of California. The award of nominal damages in addition to the reluctant if much delayed striking down of the "one area, one operator" policy exercised by the city, was considered to be a "preamble to breakup of local cable franchising" schemes which did not serve the public interest in the 1980s and 90s.

At the heart of the matter was the city's franchising scheme, which sold rights to provide cable service to the "highest bidder", pursuant a city ordinance. The city maintained that the franchise for the South Central district was "non-exclusive" however proceeded to bar entry from new applicants, including Preferred Communications Inc.

The First Amendment became relevant for according to plaintiffs, the ability to transmit ideas (through the cable medium) constituted speech, and the right of way being denied belonged to the public and not one single, exclusive and private interest.

== Supreme Court ==
The Supreme Court and ultimately two lower courts found that

- a city's right of way—to the extent it constitutes a channel for speech—may not be granted to one party exclusively, a policy known as "one area, one operator", and
- the City of Los Angeles is required to act in accordance with the United States Constitution.

The Supreme Court remanded the case for further factual consideration by the district court.

The City of Los Angeles had conceivably deprived respondent Preferred Communication Inc., from exercising its rights under the First Amendment to the Constitution of the United States of America when it refused Preferred access to the electric lines and poles on account that Preferred did not participate in an auction held by the city awarding such access to the "highest bidder."
