= East River Steamship Corp. v. Transamerica Delaval Inc. =

East River Steamship Corp v. Transamerica Delaval, Inc
- Supreme Court of the United States

Argued Jan. 21, 1986 Decided June 16, 1986
- Full case name: East River Steamship Corp v. Transamerica Delaval, Inc
- Citations: 476 U.S. 858 (more)

Court membership
- Chief Justice Warren E. Burger Associate Justices William J. Brennan Jr. · Byron White; Thurgood Marshall · Harry Blackmun; Lewis F. Powell Jr. · William Rehnquist; John P. Stevens · Sandra Day O'Connor

Case opinion
- Majority: Blackmun, joined by unanimous

East River Steamship Corp. v. Transamerica Delaval Inc., 476 U.S. 858 (1986), is a U.S. Supreme Court decision that clarified the scope of products liability under maritime law. The Court held that a manufacturer cannot be held liable in tort for purely economic losses resulting from a defective product that causes damage only to itself and not to persons or other property.

The case arose when East River Steamship Corporation and other charterers of oil supertankers sued Transamerica Delaval Inc., the manufacturer of turbine generators installed on the ships. The turbines malfunctioned due to design and manufacturing defects, resulting in repair costs and lost profits. The plaintiffs brought claims based on strict products liability and negligence, arguing that Delaval should be held liable for the economic losses caused by the defective turbines.

The Supreme Court disagreed, ruling that under maritime law, when a product injures only itself and causes no personal injury or damage to other property, the proper remedy lies in contract law (such as warranty), not tort. The Court emphasized the distinction between tort and contract remedies, finding that expanding tort liability to cover economic losses would disrupt commercial expectations. This case established an important precedent limiting tort recovery in product liability cases under maritime law.

== Background ==
East River Steamship Corp. v. Transamerica Delaval Inc. arose from a series of turbine failures aboard four oil supertankers chartered by East River Steamship Corporation and others. The vessels had been constructed by Sun Ship, Inc., and were equipped with turbine generators manufactured by Transamerica Delaval Inc. The turbines, which powered the ships, failed during operation due to defects that were later traced to poor design and manufacturing practices.

The failures occurred after the ships had been delivered and had entered service. Each breakdown required significant repair work and resulted in loss of use, causing financial losses for the charterers. The plaintiffs brought a products liability suit against Delaval, seeking damages in tort under theories of negligence and strict liability. However, the damages they sought were solely for economic loss—costs associated with repairing the defective turbines and the income lost while the ships were out of operation.

== Arguments ==
The petitioners—East River Steamship Corp. and several related companies—argued that Transamerica Delaval Inc. should be held liable in tort for the economic losses they suffered due to defective turbine generators installed on four supertankers. The turbines, which were designed and manufactured by Delaval, failed during normal operation and required extensive repairs. The petitioners brought claims under both negligence and strict products liability, asserting that the defective turbines caused sudden, dangerous malfunctions that disrupted the ships’ operations and resulted in significant financial loss. They emphasized that the failures occurred while the ships were in navigable waters and that Delaval should be held responsible under maritime tort principles for providing a defective and unsafe product.

Delaval countered that the damages sought—cost of repairs and loss of use—were purely economic and did not involve personal injury or damage to other property. Therefore, Delaval argued, the plaintiffs' tort claims were not valid under established product liability law. Instead, any remedy should lie in contractual warranty provisions, not tort.

== Decision ==
=== Lower court’s rulings ===
The District Court ruled in favor of Transamerica Delaval, holding that the plaintiffs could not recover in tort for the economic losses suffered due to the turbines' failure. The court found that since the damage was limited to the turbines themselves, the loss was not the kind covered by tort liability. The Court of Appeals for the Second Circuit affirmed, and the case was appealed to the U.S. Supreme Court.

=== Supreme Court decision ===
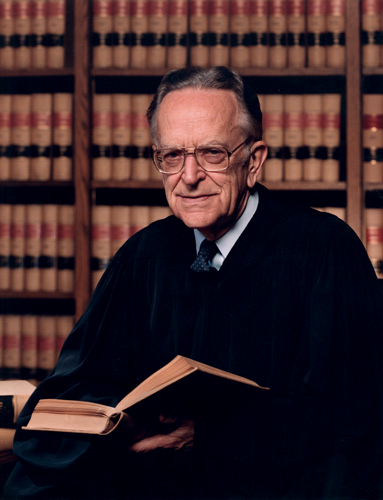
Justice Harry Blackmun authored the unanimous opinion of the Court.

Justice Harry Blackmun authored the unanimous opinion of the Court.

The Supreme Court affirmed the lower court’s ruling, holding that a manufacturer cannot be held liable in tort for purely economic losses resulting from a product that damages only itself. The Court reasoned that tort law is meant to protect people and property from unsafe products, not to serve as a substitute for contract law when products fail to meet expectations or require repairs.

== Significance ==
The Supreme Court’s decision in East River Steamship Corp. v. Transamerica Delaval Inc. clarified the limits of tort liability under maritime law, particularly in cases involving economic loss caused by product defects. The Court drew a clear line between tort and contract remedies, holding that when a defective product injures only itself and causes no personal injury or damage to other property, tort law does not apply. This distinction helped settle long-standing uncertainty over whether product malfunctions that result in financial loss—but no physical harm—could give rise to tort claims.

The ruling significantly influenced how courts address product liability claims in both maritime and non-maritime contexts. It has been widely cited in federal and state courts, especially in commercial litigation involving large-scale equipment failures or industrial products. Courts have relied on East River to limit tort recovery where contract law provides an adequate remedy—such as through warranties or negotiated risk allocations.

The case also reinforced a broader judicial trend of preserving the boundary between contract law's commercial expectations and tort law’s role in protecting against safety risks. It contributed to a more predictable legal environment for manufacturers and commercial buyers, and it remains a leading authority in cases involving the "economic loss rule," particularly in admiralty and products liability jurisprudence.
