= United States v. Dion =

- Supreme Court of the United States

Argued 25 March, 1986 Decided 11 June, 1986
- Full case name: United States v. Dwight Dion Sr.
- Citations: 476 U.S. 734 (more) 106 S. Ct. 2216; 90 L. Ed. 2d 767; 1986 U.S. LEXIS 53

Case history
- Prior: 752 F.2d 1261 (8th Cir. 1985); 762 F.2d 674 (8th Cir. 1985)

Holding
- The Court of Appeals erred in recognizing respondent's treaty defense to the prosecutions.

Court membership
- Chief Justice Warren E. Burger Associate Justices William J. Brennan Jr. · Byron White; Thurgood Marshall · Harry Blackmun; Lewis F. Powell Jr. · William Rehnquist; John P. Stevens · Sandra Day O'Connor

Case opinion
- Majority: Marshall, joined by unanimous

Laws applied
- Eagle Protection Act

United States v. Dion, 476 U.S. 734 (1986), was a decision by the Supreme Court of the United States which held that, pursuant to the Eagle Protection Act, American Indians were prohibited from hunting eagles. Justice Thurgood Marshall wrote the unanimous opinion of the Court.

== Facts ==
Dwight Dion Sr., a member of the Yankton Sioux Tribe of South Dakota, was convicted of shooting five bald eagles in violation of the Endangered Species Act, and of selling the carcasses in violation of the Eagle Protection Act and Migratory Bird Treaty Act. The takings occurred on the Yankton Indian Reservation. The reservation was created by an 1858 treaty; the Yankton tribe ceded all but 400,000 acres (1,600 km^{2}) of their territory to the United States. In exchange for the land, the United States guaranteed the tribe quiet and undisturbed possession of the reserved land, as well as monetary compensation. All parties to the litigation acknowledged that the treaty granted exclusive rights to hunt and fish on the reservation.

The Eagle Protection Act, by its express terms, made it a federal offense to hunt bald or golden eagles anywhere within the United States unless provided a permit by the Secretary of the Interior. The Endangered Species Act also imposed strict sanctions on the hunting of species such as the bald eagle that have been listed as endangered or threatened.

== Procedural history ==
The District Court convicted Dion for the shooting of bald eagles in violation of the Endangered Species Act, and for the distribution of carcasses in violation of the Eagle Protection Act. The Court of Appeals for the Eighth Circuit, however, held that members of the Yankton Sioux Tribe have a treaty right to hunt bald eagles within the Yankton Reservation for noncommercial purposes. It also held that the Eagle Protection Act and Endangered Species Act did not abrogate this treaty right. Since neither the District Court nor the jury ruled on whether the killings were for commercial or noncommercial purposes, the appellate court directed that Dion's convictions for shooting bald eagles be vacated. The Supreme Court granted certiorari to determine the correctness of the Eighth Circuit's holding that noncommercial hunting of bald eagles on the Yankton reservation was not punishable under the Endangered Species Act or Eagle Protection Act.

== Decision ==
The Court began by acknowledging that generally Indian tribes enjoy the exclusive rights to hunt and fish on lands granted to them by treaty; such rights, however, could be abrogated by the express terms of Congress. Citing Lone Wolf v. Hitchcock as precedent, the Court concluded that Congress retained the power to modify Indian treaties so long as it does so in clear and explicit terms. Justice Marshall acknowledged that the Court has adopted different standards of review to determine whether Congress intended to abrogate treaty rights. The overriding emphasis, however, is evidence that Congress considered the effect of its actions on existing treaty rights, and chose to resolve the conflict by abrogating the treaty. The Court found that such evidence was strongly suggested on the face of the Eagle Protection Act. The statute allowed for the Secretary of the Interior to grant permits to Indians in some situations; such a framework convincingly showed that Congress was aware of the effect its action would have on Indian hunting rights. The Court also found compelling evidence of congressional intent in the legislative history of the Act. Before hearings on an amendment to extend protection to the golden eagle, Assistant Secretary of the Interior Frank P. Briggs wrote a letter to the subcommittee acknowledging the religious significance of the golden eagle to many Indian tribes of the southwest. The record also revealed that various witnesses gave testimony as to the effects of the ban on Indian tribes. The bill passed with an amendment granting the Secretary the authority to grant case specific permits for Indians to hunt eagles for religious purposes. The Court found adequate evidence in the legislative history that Congress intended to abrogate the treaty rights of Indians.

The Court was unconvinced by the respondent's evidence of an Interior Department memorandum stating that the Eagle Protection Act did not apply to Indian tribes. The Court found no evidence that the memorandum was ever shown to, or contemplated by Congress. The respondent argued further that the permit framework was meant to bind non-Indians from hunting eagles for Indian religious ceremonies, but did not deprive Indian hunters of their exclusive right to hunt eagles on reservations. The Court thought this argument strained credulity.

Finally, Dion asserted a treaty defense to his convictions under the Endangered Species Act. Because the legislative history of that Act revealed almost no discussion of its effect on Indian rights, Dion argued that he was immune from prosecution. The Court disagreed, however, stating that because the Eagle Protection Act divested Dion of his right to hunt eagles, he was barred from asserting that right as a defense in another context such as the Endangered Species Act.

== Ruling ==
The Court of Appeals ruling was reversed to the extent it recognized a treaty defense to the Eagle Protection Act and Endangered Species Act prosecutions, and remanded for further proceedings consistent with the Court's opinion. Because the issue was not raised on appeal, the Court did not rule on whether Congress' criminalization of hunting eagles violated Dion's religious freedom.

== See also ==
- List of United States Supreme Court cases, volume 476
- List of United States Supreme Court cases
- Lists of United States Supreme Court cases by volume
- List of United States Supreme Court cases by the Rehnquist Court
