= Bowen v. Roy =

- Supreme Court of the United States

Argued January 14, 1986 Decided June 11, 1986
- Full case name: Otis R. Bowen, Secretary of Health and Human Services, et al. v. Stephen J. Roy, et al.
- Citations: 476 U.S. 693 (more) 106 S. Ct. 2147; 90 L. Ed. 2d 735; 1986 U.S. LEXIS 52; 54 U.S.L.W. 4603

Case history
- Prior: Roy v. Cohen, 590 F. Supp. 600 (M.D. Pa. 1984); probable jurisdiction noted, 472 U.S. 1016 (1985).

Holding
- The statutory requirement that a state agency utilize Social Security numbers in administering the programs in question does not violate the Free Exercise Clause, which only affords an individual protection from certain forms of governmental compulsion but does not afford an individual a right to dictate the conduct of the Government's internal procedures. The Government's use of a Social Security number for appellees' child does not itself impair appellees' freedom to exercise their religion.

Court membership
- Chief Justice Warren E. Burger Associate Justices William J. Brennan Jr. · Byron White; Thurgood Marshall · Harry Blackmun; Lewis F. Powell Jr. · William Rehnquist; John P. Stevens · Sandra Day O'Connor

Case opinions
- Majority: Burger (parts I, II), joined by Brennan, Marshall, Blackmun, Powell, Rehnquist, Stevens, O'Connor
- Concurrence: Burger (part III), joined by Powell, Rehnquist
- Concurrence: Blackmun
- Concurrence: Stevens
- Concur/dissent: O'Connor, joined by Brennan, Marshall
- Dissent: White

Laws applied
- U.S. Const. amend. I

Bowen v. Roy, 476 U.S. 693 (1986), was a United States Supreme Court case which ruled that a government program requiring the use of a Social Security number did not violate the First Amendment.

== Background ==
The plaintiffs were Native American parents who had applied for financial assistance under a U.S. government welfare program. One of the requirements to receive Aid to Families with Dependent Children and food stamps under these programs was that the applicants supply Social Security numbers for their children and themselves. The plaintiffs refused to do so for their daughter, named Little Bird of the Snow, as they claimed use of this number outside her choosing to do so when she came of age, a form of spiritual self-actualization, would violate their religious beliefs. Their belief was that using a Social Security number to identify her would diminish her spiritual uniqueness and "rob her spirit". At trial Roy testified "...It serves unique purposes. It's applied to her and only her; and being applied to her, that's what offends us, and we try to keep her person unique, and we try to keep her spirit unique, and we're scared that if we were to use this number, she would lose control of that and she would have no ability to protect herself from any evil that that number might be used against her." Other religious faiths had expressed closely similar objections — biblical Christians quoting Revelation, asserting that the SSN is one of a system of numbers the Antichrist will cause all people in American society to accept and use in order to function, to buy or sell goods, or Social Security numbers are the "mark of the beast", of the Antichrist who threatens to control the world and to accept a number is to "serve the beast".

When the Roys refused to provide a Social Security number for their daughter, the Pennsylvania Department of Public Welfare cut benefits for Little Bird of the Snow to comply with federal guidelines. The Roys then filed suit, claiming infringement of their right to practice their religion. In the Middle District Court for Pennsylvania, both sides stipulated before and during trial that Little Bird of the Snow did not have a Social Security number. During the last day of the trial, the Social Security Administration disclosed it did, after a search, already possess a Social Security number issued shortly after Little Bird of the Snow's birth.

In its brief before the Court, the government's brief informed the Social Security Administration "...itself assigns [Social Security numbers] to persons who are required by federal law to have one but decline to complete an application. If, for religious reasons, the individual requiring [a Social Security number] does not wish to receive a Social Security card, the agency will accommodate that request. Similarly, when an applicant refuses to sign an application for [a Social Security number] on religious grounds, [Social Security Administration personnel] may sign in lieu of the applicant."

== Decision ==
The Supreme Court ruled that the government's use of a Social Security number for the child did not impair her family's freedom to "believe, express and exercise" their religion, and that the plaintiffs' claim was without merit. In the majority opinion, Chief Justice Warren Burger noted that "never to our knowledge has the Court interpreted the First Amendment to require the Government itself to behave in ways that the individual believes will further his or her spiritual development or that of his or her family", vacating an injunction entered by the District Court enjoining use of a Social Security number by the government.

Concurring in part and dissenting in part, Justice O'Connor noted, "The Government still refuses to concede that it should now provide welfare benefits to Little Bird of the Snow, even though it now claims to possess Little Bird of the Snow's Social Security number."

By a plurality decision, it was remanded back to the Federal District Court for the Middle District of Pennsylvania, for a hearing on whether the government complied with the Privacy Act in issuing and using a Social Security number. The case was eventually settled with the plaintiffs and government agreeing that all records and data in all its computers containing a Social Security number for Little Bird of the Snow Roy were to be eradicated or erased.

== See also ==
- List of United States Supreme Court cases, volume 476
- List of United States Supreme Court cases
- Lists of United States Supreme Court cases by volume
- List of United States Supreme Court cases by the Rehnquist Court
