= Basin F =

Chemical waste disposal facility in Colorado, USA

Coordinates: 39.8458°N 104.8555°W

Basin F was constructed by the United States Army in 1956 at the Rocky Mountain Arsenal, to provide for the disposal of contaminated liquid wastes from the chemical manufacturing operations of the Army and its lessee, Shell Chemical Company.

As originally constructed, Basin F was equipped with a catalytically-blown asphalt liner (approximately 3/8-inch (10 mm) thick) covered with a 12-inch (300 mm) protective soil blanket. Basin F had a maximum capacity of 243 million US gallons (920,000 m^{3}) and covered approximately 93 acres (380,000 m^{2}). Throughout the operation of Basin F, the saline concentration increased as water evaporated. The liquid formerly stored in Basin F is very salty water that contains some metals, hydrazine, wastewater, and toxic organics, which are about 1 percent of the liquid.

== Interim response ==
The Basin F Interim Response Action began in March 1988 and involved the transfer by tank truck of 4 million US gallons (15,000 m^{3}) of Basin F liquid to three 1.3 million US gallons (4,900 m^{3}) holding tanks and approximately 6.5 million US gallons (25,000 m^{3}) to a double-lined holding pond.

In May 1988, near the start of the project, a heavy rainfall classified as a 25-year/24-hour event occurred which increased the volume of Basin F liquid. In June 1988, a tornado touched down near the tanks and ponds. The need to inspect and repair structures and equipment affected by the twister caused a minor schedule delay.

The increased volume of liquid in Basin F caused by the heavy rainfall in May 1988 required additional storage capacity. Two double-lined holding ponds were constructed: a 5.5 million US gallons (21,000 m^{3}) pond (Pond B) and an 6.5 million US gallons (25,000 m^{3}) pond (Pond A). The 488,000 cubic yards (373,000 m^{3}) of basin overburden, liner, and subsoils were excavated and placed in a waste pile located within the basin area.

== Remediation of Basin F ==
The basin floor was capped with 12 inches (300 mm) of compact clay and 6 inches (150 mm) of topsoil and revegetated with native grass. This portion of the Basin F Interim Response Action was completed in August 1989.

Once the liquid was drained from Basin F, the drying of the soils, sediments, and liner began. This project caused an odor resulting in discomfort to members of the surrounding community. Because of the Army's concern for the comfort of the local community during the soil drying, air purifiers were distributed to affected homes in the community to help alleviate the odors. When the odor problem began, the Army asked several health agencies to study the problem to determine if there were any long-term or acute health effects. Toxicologists from Colorado State Health Department, United States Agency for Toxic Substance and Disease Registry, United States Environmental Protection Agency, Shell Oil Company, Tri-County Health, the Army's Surgeon General's Office, and Foster-Wheeler (or previously, Ebasco, the contractor for the project) identified the compounds and determined that there were no acute health effects. The odors ended with the completion of the excavation in December 1988.

The total cost of the project was about $45 million. The decision on the final disposal of the liquid was reached in March 1990.

== See also ==
- Rocky Mountain Arsenal
