= List of United States Supreme Court cases, volume 476 =

This is a list of all the United States Supreme Court cases from volume 476 of the United States Reports:

| Case name | Citation | Date decided |
|---|---|---|
| Skipper v. South Carolina | 476 U.S. 1 | 1986 |
| McLaughlin v. United States | 476 U.S. 16 | 1986 |
| EEOC v. FLRA | 476 U.S. 19 | 1986 |
| Turner v. Murray | 476 U.S. 28 | 1986 |
| Diamond v. Charles | 476 U.S. 54 | 1986 |
| Batson v. Kentucky | 476 U.S. 79 | 1986 |
| Smalis v. Pennsylvania | 476 U.S. 140 | 1986 |
| Poland v. Arizona | 476 U.S. 147 | 1986 |
| Lockhart v. McCree | 476 U.S. 162 | 1986 |
| California v. Ciraolo | 476 U.S. 207 | 1986 |
| Dow Chemical Co. v. United States | 476 U.S. 227 | 1986 |
| Brock v. Pierce County | 476 U.S. 253 | 1986 |
| Wygant v. Jackson Board of Education | 476 U.S. 267 | 1986 |
| Henderson v. United States | 476 U.S. 321 | 1986 |
| Bowen v. Owens | 476 U.S. 340 | 1986 |
| Louisiana Pub. Serv. Comm'n v. FCC | 476 U.S. 355 | 1986 |
| Longshoremen v. Davis | 476 U.S. 380 | 1986 |
| Square D Co. v. Niagara Frontier Tariff Bureau, Inc. | 476 U.S. 409 | 1986 |
| FDIC v. Philadelphia Gear Corp. | 476 U.S. 426 | 1986 |
| Public Serv. Comm'n of Md. v. Chesapeake & Potomac Telephone Co. of Md. | 476 U.S. 445 | 1986 |
| FTC v. Indiana Federation of Dentists | 476 U.S. 447 | 1986 |
| Bowen v. City of New York | 476 U.S. 467 | 1986 |
| City of Los Angeles v. Preferred Communications, Inc. | 476 U.S. 488 | 1986 |
| South Carolina v. Catawba Indian Tribe, Inc. | 476 U.S. 498 | 1986 |
| Lee v. Illinois | 476 U.S. 530 | 1986 |
| United States v. Hemme | 476 U.S. 558 | 1986 |
| Brown-Forman Distillers Corp. v. New York State Liquor Authority | 476 U.S. 573 | 1986 |
| United States v. Hughes Properties, Inc. | 476 U.S. 593 | 1986 |
| Bowen v. American Hospital Assn. | 476 U.S. 610 | 1986 |
| Bowen v. Michigan Academy of Family Physicians | 476 U.S. 667 | 1986 |
| Crane v. Kentucky | 476 U.S. 683 | 1986 |
| Bowen v. Roy | 476 U.S. 693 | 1986 |
| United States v. Dion | 476 U.S. 734 | 1986 |
| Thornburgh v. American College of Obstetricians & Gynecologists | 476 U.S. 747 | 1986 |
| United States v. Mottaz | 476 U.S. 834 | 1986 |
| Reed v. Campbell | 476 U.S. 852 | 1986 |
| East River Steamship Corp. v. Transamerica Delaval Inc. | 476 U.S. 858 | 1986 |
| Three Affiliated Tribes of Fort Berthold Reservation v. Wold Engineering, P. C. | 476 U.S. 877 | 1986 |
| Attorney General of N. Y. v. Soto-Lopez | 476 U.S. 898 | 1986 |
| Lyng v. Payne | 476 U.S. 926 | 1986 |
| Nantahala Power & Light Co. v. Thornburg | 476 U.S. 953 | 1986 |
| Young v. Community Nutrition Institute | 476 U.S. 974 | 1986 |
| California v. Hamilton | 476 U.S. 1301 | 1986 |
