= Rocky Mountain Arsenal National Wildlife Refuge =

Protected area near Denver, Colorado

- IUCN category IV (habitat/species management area)
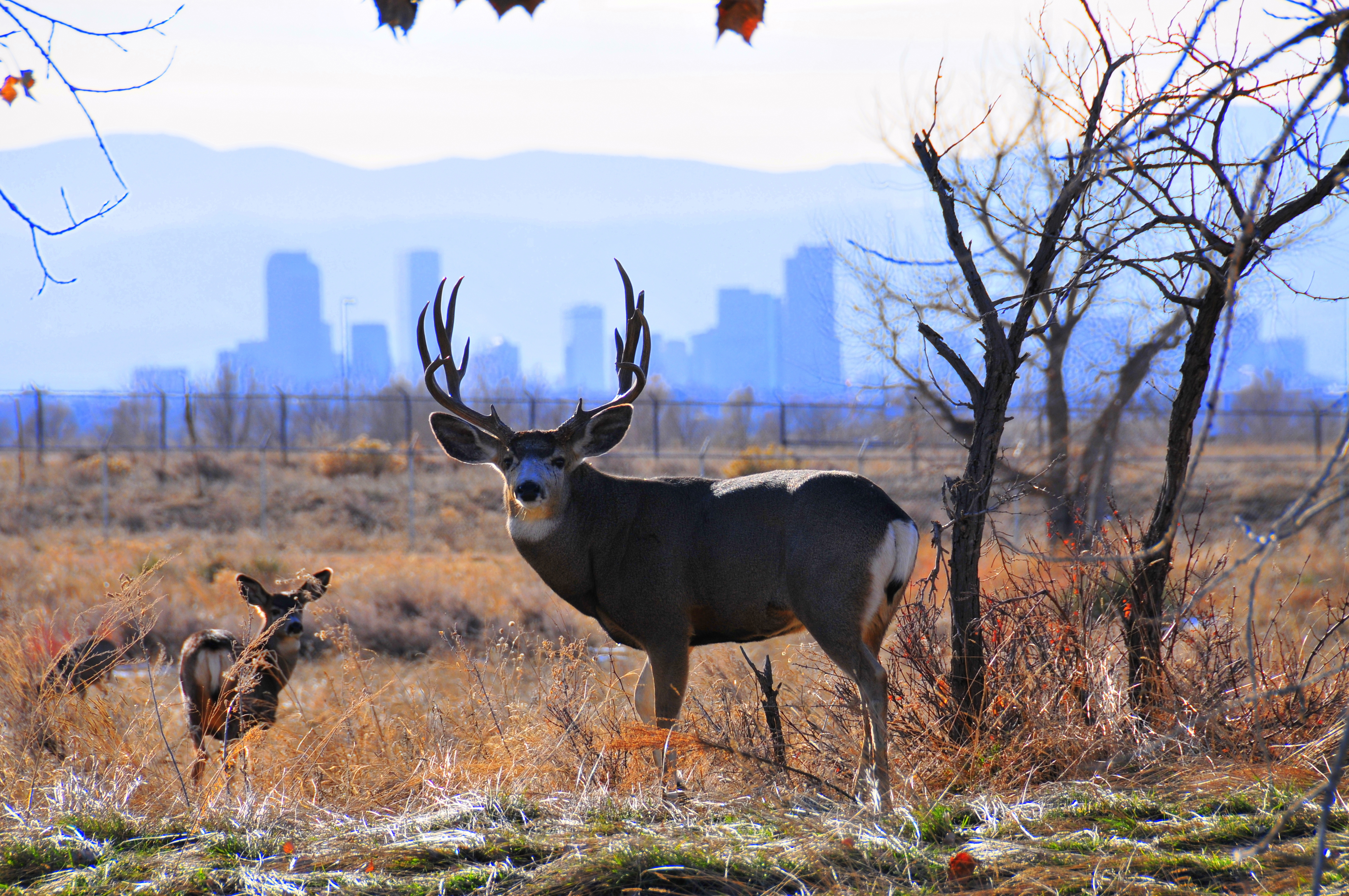
- Mule deer in Rocky Mountain Arsenal National Wildlife Refuge; downtown Denver is visible in the background.

- Location within the United States Location within Colorado
- Location: Adams County, Colorado, U.S.
- Nearest city: Commerce City, Colorado
- Coordinates: 39°50′0″N 104°50′30″W
- Area: 15,988 acres (64.70 km^{2})
- Established: 1992
- Visitors: 300,000 (in 2013)
- Governing body: United States Fish and Wildlife Service
- Website: Rocky Mountain Arsenal National Wildlife Refuge

The Rocky Mountain Arsenal National Wildlife Refuge is a 15,988-acre (24.981 sq mi) National Wildlife Refuge located adjacent to Denver and Commerce City, Colorado, in the United States. It is approximately 8 miles (13 km) northeast of downtown Denver. The refuge is on the grounds of the former Rocky Mountain Arsenal, a United States Army chemical weapons manufacturing facility. The site was designated a national wildlife refuge in 1992 by the United States Congress, and underwent a costly environmental cleanup in order to remove pollutants. The refuge is managed by the United States Fish and Wildlife Service. More than 330 species of wildlife inhabit the refuge, including raptors, deer, raccoons, coyotes, white pelicans, black-footed ferrets, black-tailed prairie dogs, and bison.

== Previous uses ==
The Rocky Mountain Arsenal (RMA) was built in 1942 to manufacture chemical weapons. A portion of the site was leased to private industry in 1946 for petroleum production and agricultural and industrial chemical manufacturing. When the American chemical weapons program was shut down after the Vietnam War, the RMA served as a site for dismantling and disposing of these weapons. The Shell Oil Company also used a portion of the site in the 1980s to produce pesticides. The RMA was closed in 1985, and in 1987 environmental testing revealed that the site was extremely polluted. The RMA was listed on the National Priorities List, a list of hazardous waste sites in the United States eligible for long-term remedial action (cleanup) financed under the federal Superfund program run by the Environmental Protection Agency.

In 1986, while environmental testing was continuing, a winter communal roost of bald eagles, then an endangered species, was discovered at the Rocky Mountain Arsenal. Additional investigation by the U.S. Fish and Wildlife Service (USFWS) discovered that the RMA was home more than 330 species of wildlife. With the arsenal not fit for human habitation, pressure quickly built to have it turned into a wildlife refuge. Congress enacted the Rocky Mountain Arsenal National Wildlife Refuge Act on September 25, 1992, and the legislation was signed into law by President George H. W. Bush on October 9. The law stipulated that a majority of the RMA site would become a national wildlife refuge under the jurisdiction of the Fish and Wildlife Service once the environmental restoration is completed. The Act also provided that, to the extent possible, the RMA was to be managed as a wildlife refuge in the interim.

At the time the refuge was established, the RMA consisted of more than 17,000 acres (69 km^{2}) of grassland dotted with small manmade lakes and ponds. Not all of this land was set aside for the refuge. Section 2(c)(2) of the enabling legislation set aside 12.08 acres (0.0489 km^{2}) for use as the South Adams County Water Treatment Plant and 63.04 acres (0.2551 km^{2}) for a United States Postal Service facility. Section 5(a)(1) of the act designated another 815 acres (3.30 km^{2}) for public sale. The former Shell Oil Company land also proved to be a problem, as it was somewhat geographically isolated from the rest of the refuge and not likely to be used by wildlife as habitat. Subsequently, about 100 acres (0.40 km^{2}) of the Shell Oil site was sold to Commerce City in 2010. Of the remaining 250 acres (1.0 km^{2}) of the Shell site, 100 acres (0.40 km^{2}) are (as of 2013) being used for a water treatment facility and another 150 acres (0.61 km^{2}) for domestic livestock grazing. The USFWS anticipates selling these 250 acres (1.0 km^{2}) by 2023. These land set-asides, sales, and transfers left the refuge with 15,988 acres (64.70 km^{2}) of land.

== History ==
The entire 17,000 acres (69 km^{2}) of the old RMA was included in the remediation effort. On January 21, 2003, the Environmental Protection Agency (EPA) certified 940 acres (3.8 km^{2}) as ready for use, and this acreage was turned over to the USFWS. Another 5,053 acres (20.45 km^{2}) were certified clean on January 15, 2004. This allowed USWFS to formally open the Rocky Mountain Arsenal National Wildlife Refuge on April 2, 2004. At that time, walking trails gave guests access to about 2,000 acres (8.1 km^{2}) of the refuge, and buses allowed visitors to tour another 3,000 acres (12 km^{2}). EPA released another 7,399 acres (29.94 km^{2}) on July 31, 2006. The remaining 2,596 acres (10.51 km^{2}) were declared contaminant-free and turned over to the refuge on October 15, 2010. The total cost of the cleanup was $2.1 billion.

The refuge's Visitor Center opened on May 21, 2011. About two-thirds of the refuge consists of mixed-grass and shortgrass prairie, while the remainder is a mix of forest, shrubland, and lakes, streams, and riparian areas. A large number of man-made features dot the landscape, including irrigation ditches, lakes and ponds, and former homesteads. Beginning in 2011, the USFWS began implementing a plan to remove invasive plant species and restore native plants on most of the refuge. As of 2013, the USFWS had identified 332 species of wildlife on the refuge. Most of these species exist only in very low numbers.

Sixteen American bison were brought from the National Bison Range in Montana to an enclosed 1,400-acre (5.7 km^{2}) section of the refuge in March 2007 as part of the USFWS Pilot Bison Project. The number of bison reached 87 in 2013, forcing the USFWS to reduce the herd to just 60 animals as the limited acreage could not support so many animals. USFWS officials said that in a few years they would expand the bison acreage to 12,000 acres (49 km^{2}), which would allow the herd to expand to an anticipated 210 animals.

The conservation of bison is an ongoing, diverse effort to bring bison back from the brink of extinction. The 2020 Bison Conservation Initiative by the Department of the Interior has five central goals: wild, healthy bison herds; genetic conservation; shared stewardship; ecological restoration; and cultural restoration. It strengthened mechanisms for delivery of bison to Native American tribes from federal herds. Starting at 2021 roundup, excess bison began to be donated to tribes with the Wolakota Buffalo Range receiving them this year and for the first time, Indigenous peoples joined refuge staff for the roundup. Six yearling female bison were also transferred from the Refuge to Theodore Roosevelt National Park, where National Park Service experts will study the extent to which translocated animals integrate into established herds. In 2025, Mayor Mike Johnston proposed building the American Indian Cultural Embassy at the refuge.

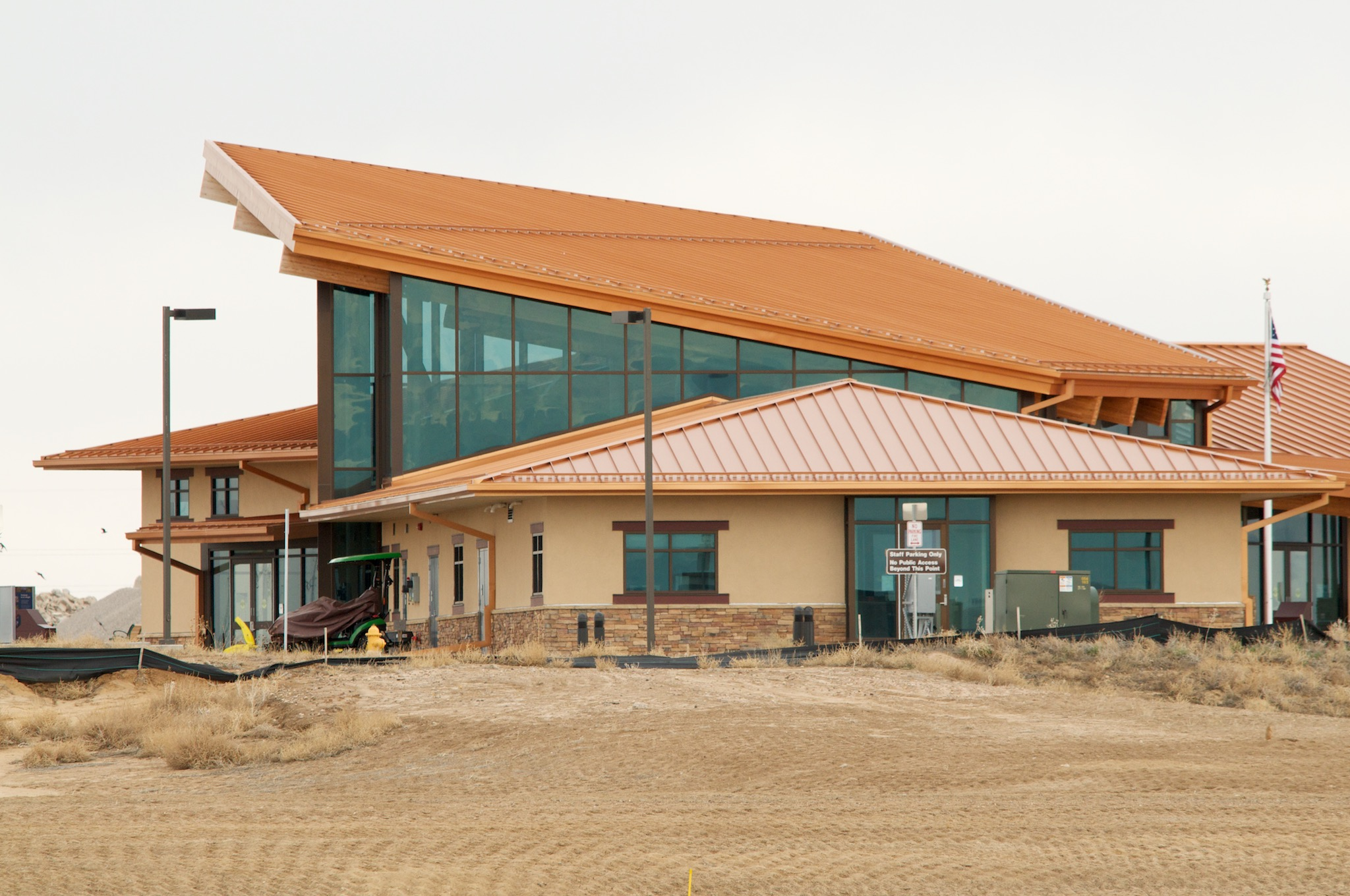
Visitor Center

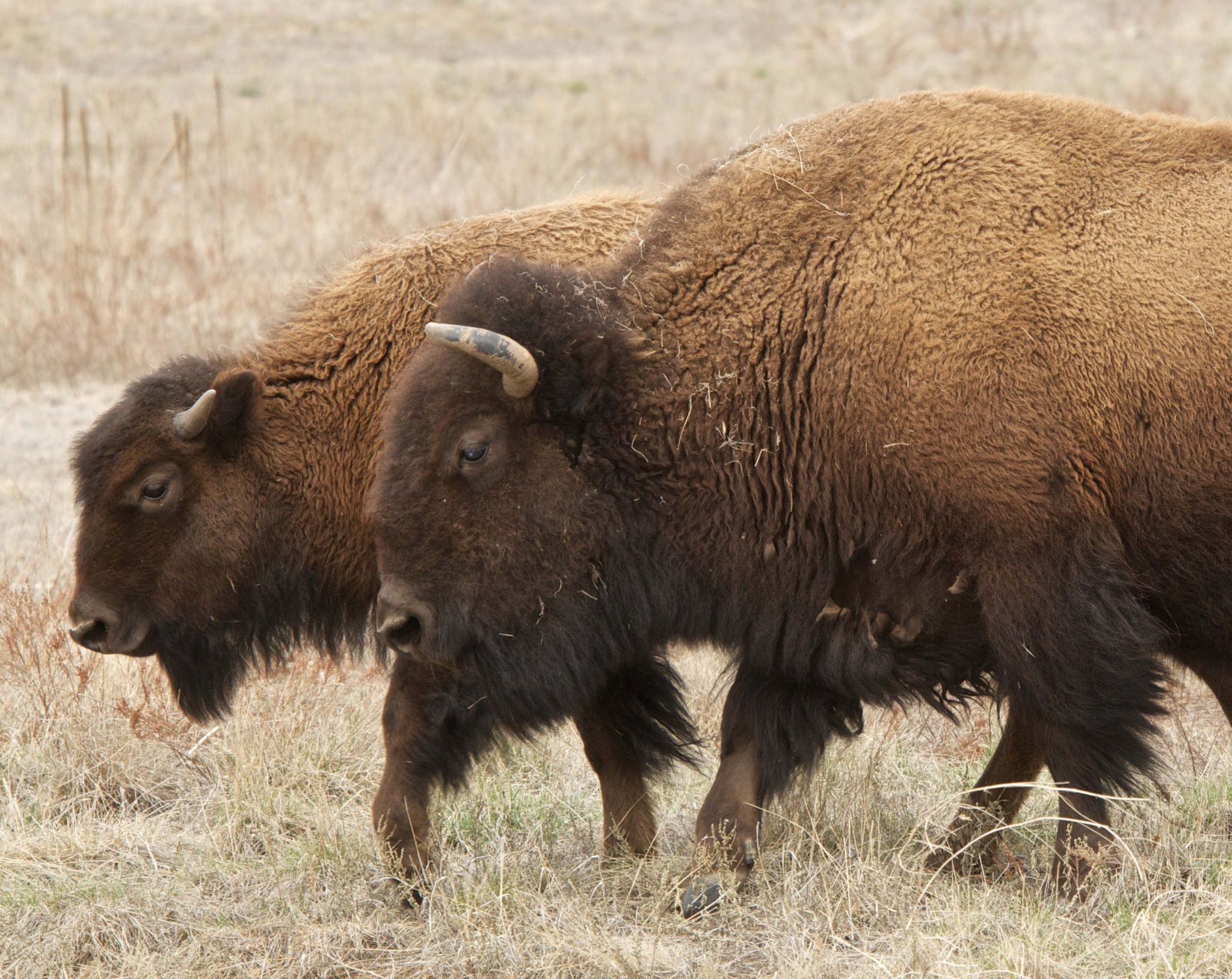
Bison mother and calf

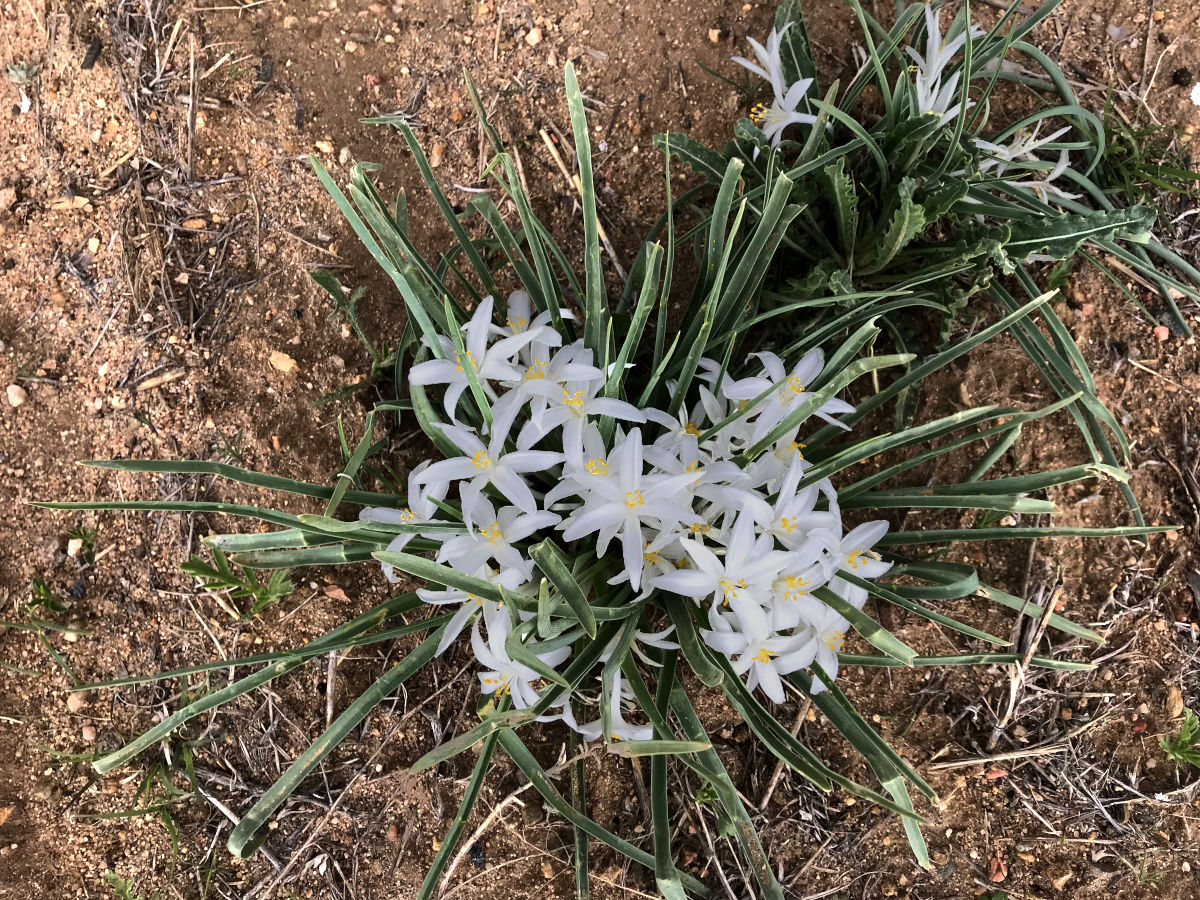
Common starlily

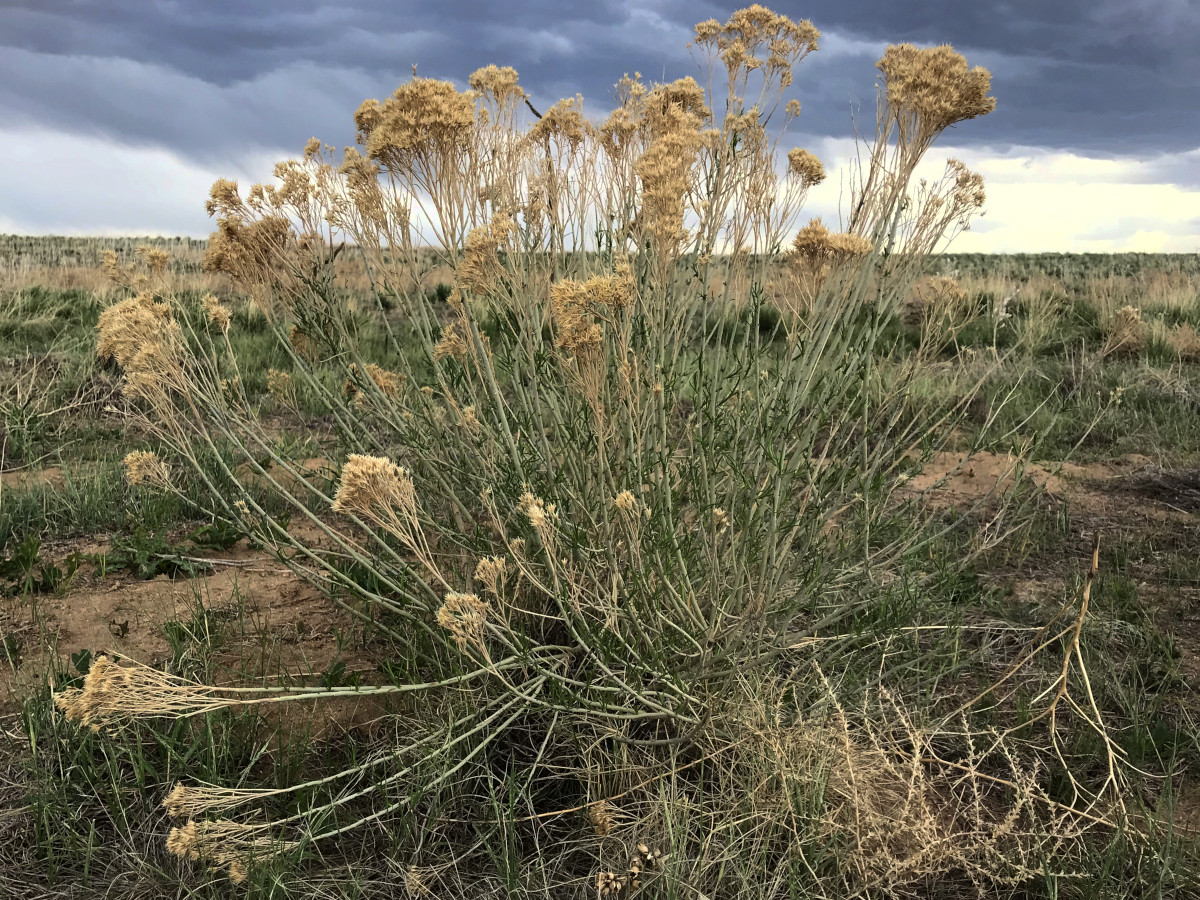
Rubber rabbitbrush

== Management ==
All land included in the Rocky Mountain Arsenal National Wildlife Refuge was turned over to the Department of the Interior with management of the refuge being the responsibility of both the USFWS and the U.S. Army. Some land may still contain chemical weapons devices (such as unexploded projectiles or buried equipment) and cannot safely be integrated into the wildlife refuge, so the Fish & Wildlife Service manages 14,904 acres (60.31 km^{2}) of land. The remainder of the property (1,084 acres (4.39 km^{2})) is managed by the U.S. Army. The USFWS and Army signed an inter-agency agreement to cooperate in the management of the Army land according to UWFWS principles.

A Comprehensive Management Plan for the refuge was finalized in June 1996. Under the plan, the refuge is available for public use, and community outreach and educational programs will be implemented to encourage public use.

A record 950,000 people visited the refuge in 2023. Refuge officials say they expect visitation to top one million annually once visitor facilities, outreach plans, and a wildlife management plan are completely in place.

== See also ==
- National Eagle Repository
- Involuntary park

== Bibliography ==
- U.S. Fish and Wildlife Service (2013). Rocky Mountain Arsenal National Wildlife Refuge: Draft Habitat Management Plan (PDF). Commerce City, Colo.: U.S. Department of the Interior. Archived from the original (PDF) on March 4, 2016.
