= Bald and Golden Eagle Protection Act =

United States federal statute

- Long title: Bald and Golden Eagle Protection Act
- Acronyms (colloquial): BGEPA
- Nicknames: Eagle Act
- Enacted by: the 76th United States Congress
- Effective: June 8, 1940

Citations
- Public law: Pub. L. 86–70, Pub. L. 87–884, Pub. L. 92–535, Pub. L. 95–616
- Statutes at Large: 54 Stat. 250, 73 Stat. 143, 76 Stat. 1346, 86 Stat. 1064, 92 Stat. 3114

Codification
- U.S.C. sections created: 16 U.S.C. § 668

Legislative history
- Signed into law by President John F. Kennedy on 1962

The Bald and Golden Eagle Protection Act is a United States federal statute that protects two species of eagle.

The bald eagle was chosen as a national emblem of the United States by the Continental Congress of 1782 and was given legal protection by the Bald Eagle Protection Act of 1940. This act was expanded to include the golden eagle in 1962. Since the original Act, the Bald and Golden Eagle Protection Act has been amended several times. It currently prohibits anyone, without a permit issued by the Secretary of the Interior, from "taking" bald eagles. Taking is described to include their parts, nests, or eggs, molesting or disturbing the birds. The Act provides criminal penalties for persons who "take, possess, sell, purchase, barter, offer to sell, purchase or barter, transport, export or import, at any time or any manner, any bald eagle ... [or any golden eagle], alive or dead, or any part, nest, or egg thereof."

The purpose of the Bald and Golden Eagle Protection act is to not agitate the bald and golden eagle to the extent of not 1.) Abusing an eagle, 2.) Interfering with its substantial lifestyle, including shelter, breeding, feeding, or 3.) Nest abandonment. The eagle feathers have been collected and incorporated into clothing, art, jewelry, etc. In addition, having the possession, exchange, or sale of bald eagle feathers violates the act if no permit is obtained. The basic structure of the act resembles the Migratory Bird Treaty Act.

== The importance of the bald and golden eagle ==
=== Bald eagle ===
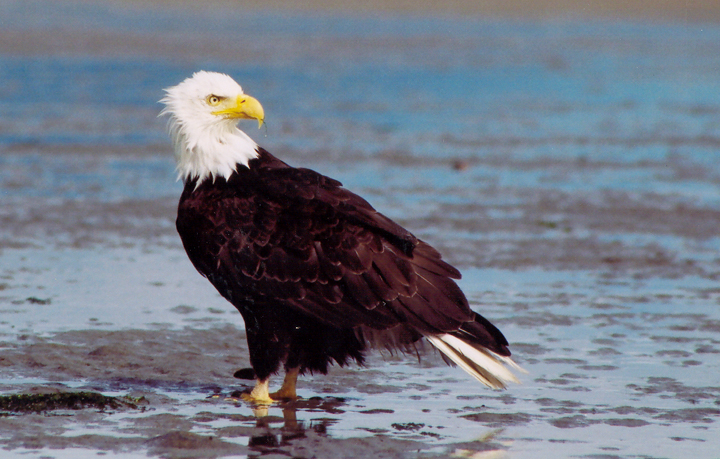
Bald eagle

The bald eagle has inspired millions of Americans across the nation since June 20, 1782. The American Eagle Day was celebrated ideally for the recovery and restoration of this exclusive bird. On June 28, 2007, the Department of the Interior took the bald eagle off the endangered and threatened species list. In addition, these birds have become a national symbol. The second Constitutional congress decided upon using American bald eagles as the great seal of the United States. There were many disagreements with the choice of national symbol. For example, one of the Founding Fathers, Benjamin Franklin quoted, "I wish that the bald eagle had not been chosen as the representative of our country, he is a bird of bad moral character...Besides he is a rank coward..." He thought that the national bird should have been a wild turkey, because it is "A bird of courage". In contrast, John F. Kennedy stated, "The Founding Fathers made an appropriate choice when they selected the bald eagle as the emblem of the nation. The fierce beauty and proud independence of this great bird aptly symbolizes the strength and freedom of America."

=== Golden eagle ===
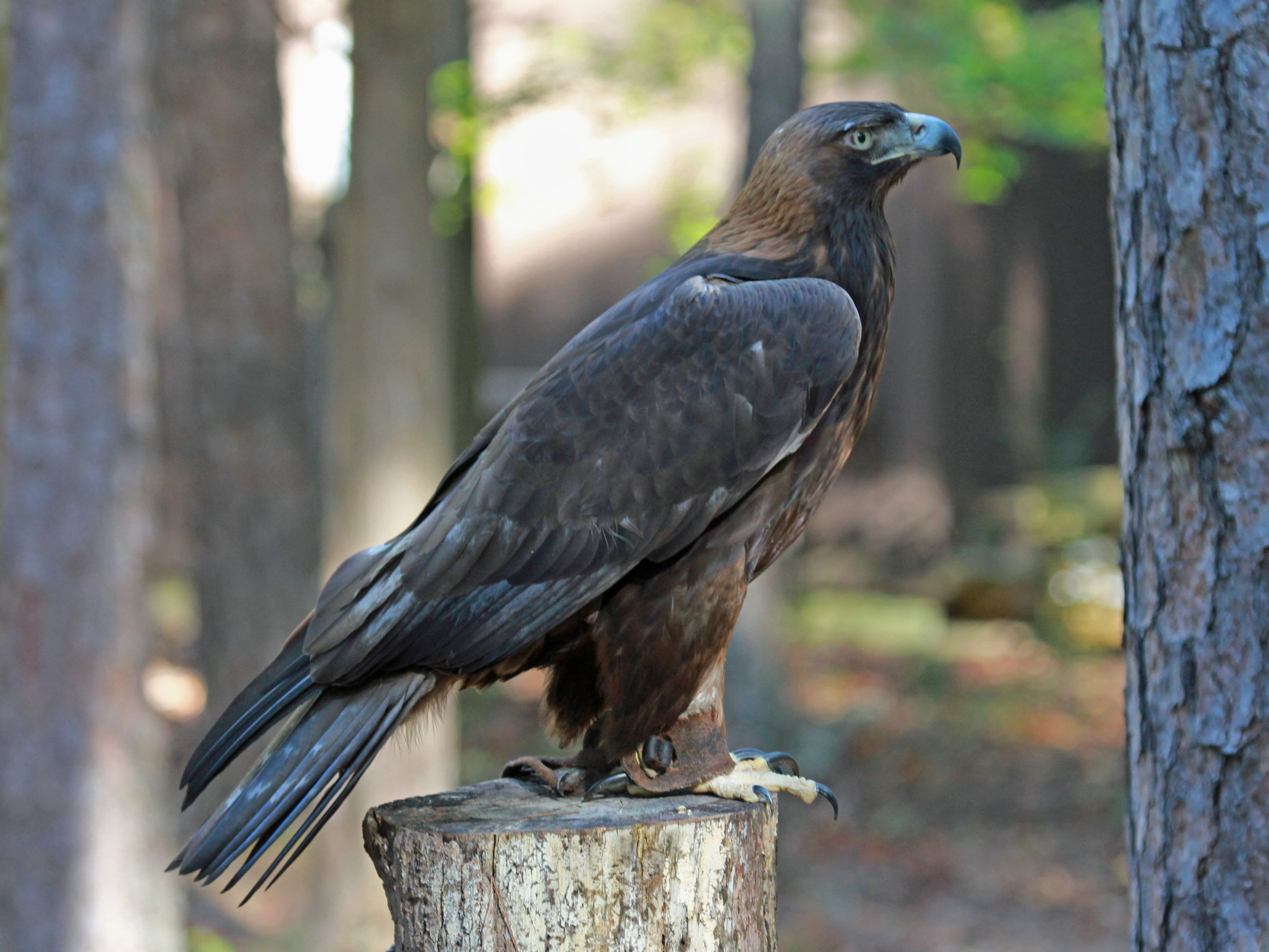
Golden eagle

The golden eagle is used as a national symbol in Mexico and in many countries; it symbolizes many cultures and traditions in various societies. It also symbolizes other countries such as Albania, Germany, Austria, and Kazakhstan. The Hopi tribe removes nestlings, raise them, and sacrifice them once they are mature. In 1986 the U.S. Fish and Wildlife Service issued a permit allowing the tribe to continue their activities legally. The golden eagle symbolizes many values such as grace, power, and magisterial wilderness. In North America, it is the largest bird of prey with physical features of dark brown with lighter golden-brown plumage. It is known as a mountain bird, which travels in open landscapes taken over by short vegetation. In the Western United States, the golden eagles were mainly found in forest areas, including tundra, shrub lands, grasslands, coniferous forests, and farmland. The eagles reside in areas where the human population is very few. The mortality of these birds is due to extensive land use and attacks from ranchers.

== Timeline ==
- 1782: The Founding Fathers at the Second Continental Congress adopted the bald eagle as the symbol of the United States. The United States had approximately 100,000 nesting eagles.
- 1921: The magazine Ecology articulated the possible extinction of the bald eagle.
- 1930: Dichlorodiphenyltrichloroethane (DDT) was first discovered
- 1940: Congress enacted legislation known as the Bald Eagle Protection Act. This act prohibited selling, killing, or possessing the species
- 1950: The bald eagle was beginning to recover from human persecution
- 1952: Bald eagle protection extended to include Alaska
- 1962: Congress amended the act, extending the ban to the golden eagle and the law became the Bald Eagle and Golden Eagle Protection Act (BEPA). This law protects the bird's feathers, eggshells, and body parts. In addition, it protects their nesting trees. Bald eagles are significant to Native American tribes and therefore BEPA gave an exception for Indian religious purposes.
- 1963: Due to shooting, DDT poisoning, and loss of habitat, the bald eagle was in danger of extinction. Within 48 states, there were only 487 nesting pairs of bald eagles.
- 1972: The Bald and Golden Eagle Protection Act was amended again with several different aspects such as increasing the civil penalties for violating provisions increased to a maximum fine of $5,000 and less than one year of imprisonment for first conviction. If second conviction occurs, a maximum fine of $10,000 and less than two years of imprisonment will take place. DDT is banned in the United States, which resulted in the initial step of recovery for the bald eagle.
- 1994: An executive issue was ordered by President Clinton which recognized the administrative delays and difficulties in obtaining eagle parts from the federal repository. Clinton also urged the relevant agencies to restructure the application process and continue the effort to obtain eagle parts to distribute to Native Americans.
- 1995: The bald eagle's status altered from endangered to threatened
- 1999: Fish and Wildlife Service (FWS) request to remove the bald eagle from the endangered species and threatened list.
- 2007: FWS and the U.S remove the bald eagle from threatened and endangered species.

== Conflict with culture and industry ==
The bald and golden eagles and their feathers are highly valued by most Native Americans. Usually, the logo of an eagle feather is seen as a symbol of the Native Americans. They honor and respect the eagles for they are believed to symbolize certain characteristics such as honesty, truth, majesty, strength, courage, wisdom, power and freedom. Native Americans consider eagles to be the Master of the sky since they fly higher than any other birds and therefore are closer to God. It is also believed that because eagles fly higher in the sky for long periods of time, they carry prayers from ground to the Creator of the world. Due to all of these reasons, wearing or receiving an eagle feather is considered a mark of honor in many Native American cultures. To capture and kill an eagle was a skill-requiring job, therefore certain men were assigned to do so. Many tribes wore the eagle feathers in their hair during ceremonies and dancing. Men would receive certain numbers of feathers depending on the task that was performed. For example, a Pillager Chippewa is costumed to give two feathers to a warrior who scalped an enemy and five feathers to one who performed an act of capturing a wounded prisoner found on the battlefield.

Under the Bald and Golden Eagle Protection Act, permits can be obtained to possess the eagles parts and feathers for religious purposes and lawful activities. In June 2007, bald eagles were removed from the Endangered Species List; however, the protection Act still applies. As of 2009, the Act has made it possible for one to obtain a permit to move from operating utilities and airports. Previously these deeds would have been considered disturbance, but now as long as it is limited, non-purposeful take of bald eagles and golden eagles; authorizing individuals, companies, government agencies (including tribal governments), and other organizations are allowed disturb or otherwise take eagles in the course of conducting lawful activities. "Non-purposeful take" is defined as taking of eagles for reasons that are associated with take that is not purposeful of an activity; but for a purpose that practically cannot be avoided.

The Act has at times hindered renewable energy projects. Wind turbines can kill and injure birds, including eagles, potentially exposing their operators to criminal liability under the Act, even those which have taken steps to reduce eagle mortality. A draft of guidelines for the wind energy industry, which incorporates means for applying for "incidental take" permits under the Act and thus avoiding its penalties, was released in 2011 by the U.S. Fish and Wildlife Service.

== Decline of the bald and golden eagle population ==
With the introduction of DDT (dichloro-diphenyl-trichloroethane) as a widespread insecticide in the United States from 1940 to 1950 to control malaria, the bald eagle population decreased precipitously, falling to a low point of 487 nesting pairs in 1963. By this point, the detrimental effects of DDT had already been a causative factor in the decline of other bird populations, and public awareness was raised when Rachel Carson published her book Silent Spring in 1962. DDT alters the calcium metabolism of female birds, preventing them from creating a hard shell around the eggs they produce. This egg thinning led to a higher rate of egg loss due to cracks during incubation. Dead birds retained large amounts of DDT in their fatty tissues and gonads which may have caused the birds to become infertile. Moreover, small animals ate plants that were sprayed with other pesticides which were then eaten by the birds of prey.

More than 100,000 bald eagles were killed in Alaska from 1917 to 1953. Public awareness arose during this time, and many groups and individuals dedicated to make the conservation of eagles a national issue. The Patuxent Wildlife Research Center in Maryland started to breed eagles in captivity to increase the population numbers. The goal was to breed enough birds to increase the population of bald eagles in areas where the population was declining and to re-introduce them in those areas where they had been wiped out completely. The center started breeding with one pair and began studying their behavior, functioning, and other areas to make this a successful rehabilitation program. In 1988, the program was stopped due to their success in increasing the number of eagles in the environment. At this time the bald eagles had started breeding naturally.

DDT is a persistent toxin know to bioaccumulate in fish populations. A major component of the diet of bald eagles consists of fish which, in turn, exposed the population of these eagles to the toxin. In contrast, the golden eagle primarily eats rabbits, hares, ground squirrels, and other common prey, which has allowed them to escape the harms of DDT and other related chemicals. Unlike the bald eagles' eggshells, the golden eagles' eggshells retained their thickness and were not subject to rupturing. DDT was banned in the United States in 1972. Other factors played a role in the declining populations of bald and golden eagles in the 1950s, 1960s, and 1970s. For instance, one source of golden and bald eagle mortality is the bioaccumulation of toxins in their reproductive system and bloodstream. Dieldrin and polychlorinated biphenyl are pollutants in the environment that have impacted eagle populations. These chemicals are persistent in the environment and are known to negatively affect these birds. Human activity is another reason for the decline of bald eagle populations. The alteration of habitat and nest disturbance have an effect on breeding and foraging. In addition, power lines can subject these birds to potential electrocution. For many years, the electric distribution utilities have worked with wildlife biologists and government agencies to research, develop and deploy power lines and poles that are safer for all birds, including eagles. Some new power lines in nonurban areas have been built to "raptor-safe" construction standards.

Another thing that impacts eagles is animal trapping. Traps are set on the ground to capture or kill animals for fur. Trapped animals can bait eagles, which then have the potential to be harmed or injured by the traps. Since an eagle's talons play a crucial role in food hunting, an injured bird can starve to death if they remain injured for a prolonged period of time. Hunting can directly or indirectly impact eagles. Duck and geese hunters who shoot but do not recover their game can indirectly harm eagles. If an eagle finds and consumes food contaminated with lead shot, the lead can accumulate in the bird, and cause toxicity and even mortality. The majority of farmers and ranchers will often shoot bald and golden eagles that they consider a threat to their livestock. Unfortunately, many assumptions are made about the bald and golden eagles, thinking that they are harmful. The two eagles are searching for dead animals that are killed from other factors.

The measures that were taken to protect bald and golden eagles, such as the 1940 Bald and Golden Eagle Protection Act, the ban on DDT in 1972, the Bald Eagle Endangered Species Act of 1973, and the United States Fish and Wildlife Service Program of 1992 (to phase out the use of lead shot for waterfowl hunting), all helped upgrade their status from 'endangered' to 'threatened'.

== Bald eagle recovery and conservation ==
Since the 1972 ban on DDT the eagle has been able to gain healthy population growth. The United States Fish and Wildlife Service was able to achieve this with the cleaning of waterways including lakes and rivers, protecting nesting sites, and reintroducing eagles back to their original environments.

The bald eagle was first proposed to be removed from the protection of the U.S. Endangered Species Act by the U.S. fish and wildlife services in the 1999 issue of the Federal Register. The final rule to remove or delist the bald eagle from the Endangered Species act was published on July 9, 2007 and was put into effect on August 8, 2007. When the bald eagle was removed the FWS had collected data on 9,789 breeding pairs.

In 1983, the Northern States Bald Eagle Recovery Plan was proposed. This plan, like the Patuxent Wildlife Research Center plan, had goals to reestablish self-sustaining populations of bald eagles throughout the Northern regions. Their initial goal was to have 1,200 occupied breeding areas, that is "the local area associated with one territorial pair of eagles and containing one or more nest structures" distributed over a minimum of 16 states within the region by year 2000. They aimed to achieve an annual productivity of 1.0 young per occupied nest. The plan had specific tasks that were characterized by following categories: 1. determine current populations and habitat status, 2. determine minimum population and habitat needed to achieve the goal, 3. protect, and increase the bald eagle populations habitats, and 4. implement a coordination system for information and communication. To achieve these tasks, annual surveys, habitat assessment, and site-specific management planning were performed to establish improved communication and coordination. They worked on improving the habitat conditions especially during winter to maximize the survival rate of these eagles.

=== Hacking technique ===
The purpose of a recovery plan for any species is to improve the ranking of the species or remove it from the endangered list. The bald eagle has recovered in most regions of the United States. The banning of DDT made a tremendous impact on the recovery of the bald and golden eagles. The bald eagle is a prominent resident in New York. In the 1960s, the declination of these birds from New York increased due to the distribution of pesticides and habitat destruction. In 1976, the Department of Environmental Conservation (DEC) formed a restoration program called the "hacking technique". The purpose of this technique is to take eaglets (hacking) from wild nests and transfer them to a region where they are raised in artificial nests. The young birds were placed on an artificial nesting platform for several weeks. The birds lived in cages once their feathers became fully developed. In addition, they were fed and watched by human caretakers. Around 12 to 13 weeks old, the eaglets were tested for their flying ability. In order to monitor the birds, a small radio transmitters were placed on the bird's back. DEC assisted with U.S. Fish and Wildlife Service and Cornell University to release 23 successful young eagles. The young eagles learned how to hunt and feed on their own without any parental care. Once they were raised and matured, they were released back to where they were raised from and in hopes of becoming breeding birds. The program was a success across the nation for 13 years. In 1989, the program ended due to an observation made by state biologists. It was observed that the population of released birds was increasing in the New York state reproducing successfully. Due to the Environmental Quality Bond act and the Environmental Protection Fund, these birds are growing at a steady rate by taking advantage of the open land and habitats.

=== Post de-listing monitoring plan ===
Under the authority of the Endangered Species Act, a post delisting monitoring plan has been created within states for all the species that have been recovered and delisted. The service requires monitoring bald eagles in a continuous manner over a period of 20 years with sampling events detained once every 5 years. The states have accumulated an attempt to check the bald eagle population annually including their nesting areas and habit areas. The objective of this plan is to gather data from the set of known nest locations and combine it with the area plot samples selected from eagle habitat areas across the nation to present a dual frame estimate. Combining the two data results will provide an accurate estimate of the actual nesting population of bald eagles. The plan includes having a close observation of the bald eagles' nests by the state natural resource/wildlife conservation agencies. The purpose of the plan is to distinguish a 25 percent change in occupied bald eagle nests on a national scale over a period of 5-year interval with an 80 percent chance of detecting a 25 percent chance or higher difference between 5-year intervals. A minimum of 200 plots are required to survey across the nation with habitats that include a medium to high density of bald eagle nests. The weather, habit change, population cycles, contaminants, and productivity will be taken into consideration if the bald eagle population is declining. In addition, under the Endangered Species act, further research, extension of monitoring, and resumption of federal protection will take place. The bald eagle's recovery is an intriguing success story. The intention of this plan is to maintain and protect the population from any harm.

=== Recovery plan in the lower 48 states ===
Table 1. The bald eagle population in the lower 48 states is divided into five recovery regions

Recovery Region	Delisting Goals	Current Estimate of Breeding Pairs
Chesapeake Bay	300–400 pairs	1,093
Pacific	800 pairs	2,157
Southeastern	1,500 breeding areas	2,227
Southwestern	Not Available	47
Northern States	1,200 breeding areas	4,215
Total 3900 pairs + Southwest 9,789 breeding pairs

== Penalty ==
=== Criminal penalty ===
The criminal penalty stipulation was increased from a maximum fine of $500 and six months imprisonment to a maximum fine of $5,000 and one year's imprisonment. Furthermore, in the case of second conviction, the penalty was increased to $10,000 fine and two years imprisonment. The maximum amount of a misdemeanor offense was increased $100,000 under the Criminal Fines and Improvement Act of 1987. In addition, $250,000 will be fined for an individual for a felony conviction. Respectively, $200,000 and $500,000 will be fined in case of an organization for a misdemeanor and felony conviction.

=== Civil penalty ===
The civil penalty provision was added, stating anyone who takes, possess, transports, sells, barters, or purchases any dead or alive bald or golden eagles will be fined $5,000 for each violation. In addition, he or she who violates or disturbs any egg or nest will be fined under the civil penalty act. The act allowed the taking, possession, or transporting of the bald and golden eagles in areas where they were endangering wildlife and livestock.

== Major code sections ==
Table 1. Major U.S. Code Sections of The Bald and Golden Eagle Protection Act (codified generally as 16 U.S.C. 668-668d)

16 U.S.C.	Section Title	Chapter	SubChapter
§668	Bald And Golden Eagles	5A	II
§668a	Taking and using of the bald and golden eagle for scientific, exhibition, and religious purposes	5A	II
§668b	Enforcement provisions	5A	II
§668c	Definitions	5A	II
§668d	Availability of appropriations for Migratory Bird Treaty Act	5A	II

== Permits ==
In 2007, the bald eagles were removed from the endangered species list due to its population recovery, except the range of Sonoran Desert where the bald eagles population still remains threatened . Upon delisting, a permit program was proposed by the United States Fish and Wildlife Service (FWS) for non-purposeful limited take of bald and golden eagles. The policy of these permits is developed by the Division of Migratory Bird Management while the actual permits are issued by the Regional Bird Permit Offices. Permits are issued to those who wish to possess eagles for conducting lawful activities or to those who may disturb an eagles' nest due to lawful activity for human safety or the safety of the birds. Issuance of a permit is based on the activity being conducted that may or may not be qualified. The following activities qualify for a permit: falconry (golden eagles only), raptor propagation, scientific collection, Indian religious purposes, take of depredating birds, taxidermy, waterfowl sale and disposal. Special purposes such as rehabilitation, educational, migratory game bird propagation, and salvage may also apply for a permit. Unlawful activities such as sale, purchase, barter, trade, importation or exportation of eagles, their feathers or their parts do not qualify for a permit .

In October 2010, the FWS also established a program that allows Native Americans to obtain non-eagle feathers from two repositories. The two locations are the Comanche Nation Ethno-Ornithological Initiative (SIA) located in Cyril, Oklahoma, and Liberty Wildlife Rehabilitation Foundation in Scottsdale, Arizona. Both of these facilities signed individual Memorandums of Agreement (MOA). The FWS permitted these repositories to salvage and obtain regulated migratory bird feathers, carcasses, and their parts to issue them to Native Americans that are federally enrolled in the U.S .

=== Permit to remove or relocate an eagle nest ===
This permit is required if an eagle nest appears to be a safety concern or conflicts with certain activities. The permit allows one to remove or relocate in the following cases: 1) inactive or active nests of necessary to alleviate a safety emergency to humans, or eagles (or both), 2) inactive nests if man-made arrangements are inoperable due to the presence of the nest, 3) inactive nests if the removal or relocation is clearly beneficial to the eagles, and 4) removal of inactive nests to ensure public health and safety .

=== Scientific collecting permit ===
The scientific collecting permit is under the Convention on International Trade in Endangered Species of Wild Fauna and Flora (CITES) and the Bald and Golden Eagle Protection Act for export, import, or transport of bald and golden eagles. This permit is required for those who are studying bald and golden eagles. It allows one to take, transport, or possess the bald and golden eagles and be able to collect feathers to conduct certain activities that are not covered by a banding permit. The act regulations require that the eagle items may be transported from and to United States on a temporary basis. The item may not change ownership and the same items must be returned to the sender at the conclusion of the project. To export any other species listed under CITES or Migratory Bird Treaty Act, in addition to bald and golden eagle parts, can be included in the application form. Applications can take up to 90 days to process.

=== The Federal Eagle Aviary and Eagle Aviary Permit ===
This permit allows Native American tribes to possess lawfully obtained live bald or golden eagles for religious activities. In order to be eligible for this permit, tribal entities must be registered and be receiving services from the United States Bureau of Indian Affairs. The Federal Eagle Aviary is a facility that houses non-releasable bald and golden eagles for the religious purposes of Native Americans. The permit's intent is to provide Native Americans with an additional source of feathers through moulting. However, human contact with live eagles is minimal with this type of permit. The Caretaker is responsible for maintaining eagles held under this permit. Caretaker must be 18 years of age and it is recommended to have 300 hours of experience over the course of two years. Experience should include: training, capturing, restraining, handling, and transporting eagles. In addition, daily husbandry activities such as caring, feeding, and medical management is also required. Some of this experience can be gained by participating in courses and seminars in handling migratory birds/raptors .

Guidelines for caging of eagles are also provided by the permit service to ensure humane and healthful conditions. Guidelines recommend a minimum enclosure of 12'L x 10'W x 9'H for non-flighted eagle and a minimum enclosure of 40'L x 10'W x 9'H for a flighted eagle. Accurate records on a calendar-year basis should be maintained reflecting the acquisition, veterinary care, and disposition of eagle. These records and the maintenance of the cage can be inspected at any reasonable hour by an authorized agent. In addition, an annual report of activities must be sent to the Regional Migratory Bird Permit Office by January 31 of each year .

=== Federal Eagle Exhibition Permit ===
This permit authorizes one to obtain bald and golden eagles, their parts, eggs, and nests for educational purposes. Museums, scientific societies, and zoological parks that is open to general public and who are established and operated as a governmental service or a privately owned but not for profit are eligible for this permit.

=== United States v. Hetzel ===
United States District Court for the District of Missouri

On March 27, 1972, Richard L. Hetzel, the defendant, was charged with violating the Bald Eagle Act. He removed the legs and talons from a dead bald eagle he had found on a beaver dam in the Squaw National Wildlife Refuge. He obtained and kept the eagle parts to bring to a Boy Scout Organization. The court established that there was no presented evidence that the defendant had willfully violated the Act and therefore he was fined one dollar. The defendant appealed the case after the nominal fee was charged. On appeal, the court reasoned that the defendant's act occurred prior to the 1972 amendments concluding that the defendant will not be punished. In addition, thousands of innocent boys have obtained eagle feathers, in which the government convicted a criminal prosecution. The court concluded that the defendant did not intentionally violate the act and therefore the court reversed his conviction and the one-dollar fine.

=== United States v. Moon Lake Electric Association Incorporated ===
United States District Court for the District of Colorado

On June 9, 1998, the United States of America filed charges against the Moon Lake Electric Association, inc., (Moon Lake) for the electrocution of several species of migratory birds, including eagles. In 1997, The Moon Lake had seven violations towards the BGEPA and six violations towards the Migratory Bird Treaty Act (MBTA). This includes the killing of 12 golden eagles, 4 ferruginous hawks, and 1 great horned owl. The government alleged that Moon Lake failed to install inexpensive equipment on 2,450 power poles resulting in the injury of 38 birds of prey within a 29-month period. Moon Lake moved toward dismissal of the charges arguing that both Acts do not apply to involuntary demeanor. The defendant, Moon Lake, argued that each Act is directed towards a "physical" taking of migratory birds and eagles through hunting and poaching. In conclusion, the court dismissed the case, concluding this did not interpret the BGEPA and the MBTA. Subsequently, Moon Lake pleaded guilty to multiple misdemeanors and charged with $100,000 fine. In addition, it entered a Memorandum of Understanding (MOU) with the U.S. Fish and Wildlife Service. The purpose of the MOU is to protect and prevent future bird deaths.

== Other laws ==
The bald eagle is also protected under the:

- Migratory Bird Treaty Act of 1918
- Endangered Species Act
- Lacey Act Amendments of 1981
