= Juneau Raptor Center =

Defunct bird rehabilitation center in Alaska, U.S.

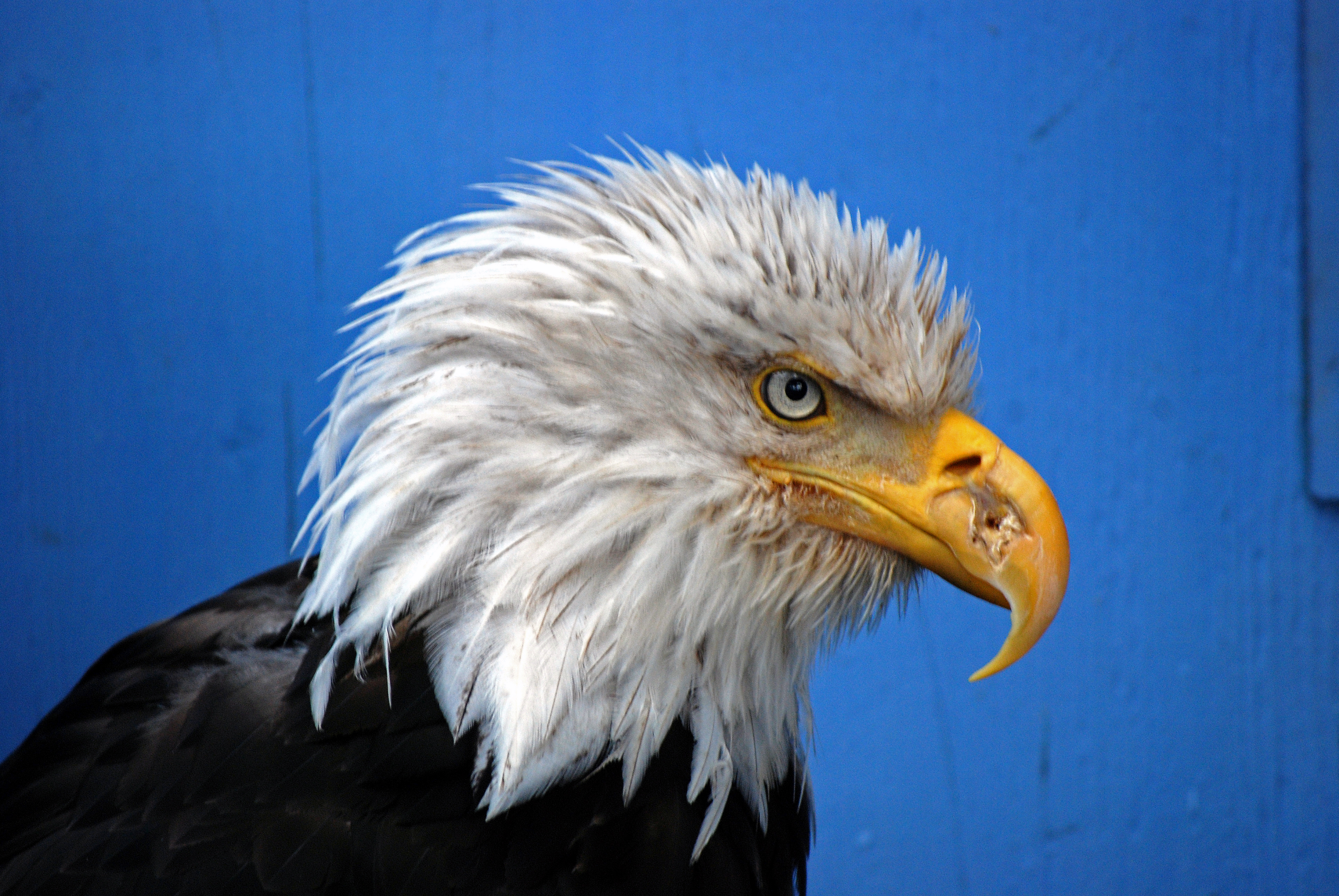
- An injured eagle on display in the JRC's Mount Roberts Tramway habitat
- Interactive map of Juneau Raptor Center
- Type: Raptor rehabilitation center
- Location: The Wharf Mall, 2 Marine Way, Juneau and Mount Roberts Tramway
- Coordinates: 58.2995°N 134.4080°W; 58.2965°N 134.3867°W
- Created: 1987
- Closed: 2022
- Operator: Dale Cotton (President)
- Other information: Exhibits: Bird rehabilitation center

The Juneau Raptor Center (JRC) was a raptor rehabilitation center in Juneau in the U.S. state of Alaska. Founded in 1987 and located in the Tongass National Forest, its mission was the rehabilitation of sick and injured eagles, hawks, falcons, owls, ravens, hummingbirds and other avian wildlife brought in from Juneau and Southeast Alaska. The JRC was licensed by the US Fish and Wildlife Service to handle eagles and migratory birds, and was governed in part by the Bald and Golden Eagle Protection Act and the Migratory Bird Treaty Act of 1918.

The Juneau Raptor Center was a private, 501(c)(3), nonprofit organization which relied on donations for its financial survival and day-to-day operation, accepting donated funds and food. Contributions have included US$10,000 from the US Fish and Wildlife Service toward its building fund, and food for the recovering birds' dietary requirements.

The Juneau Raptor Center ceased operations in 2022.

== Services ==
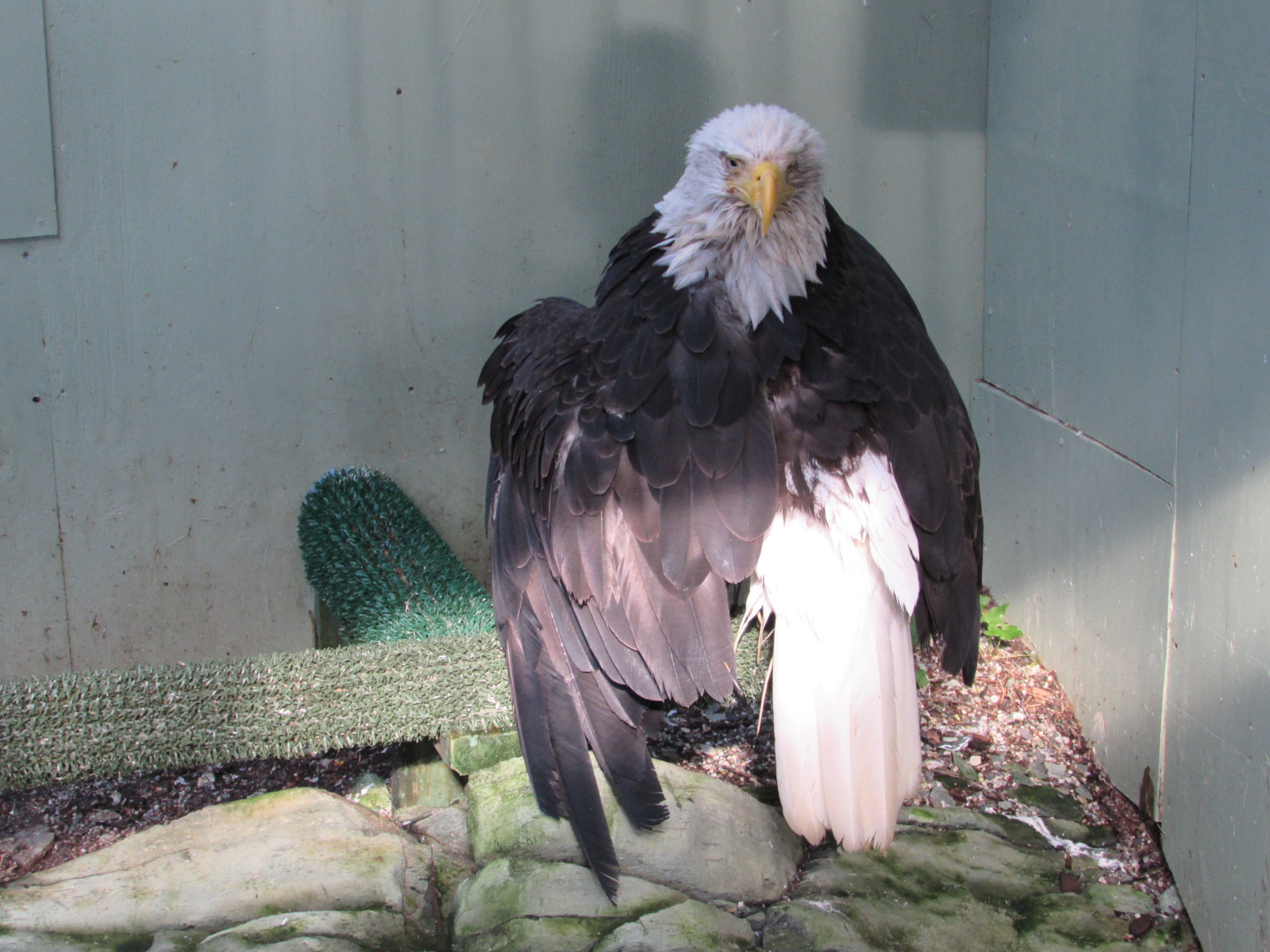
Lady Baltimore, a bald eagle in Alaska who survived a poaching attempt, in her Juneau Raptor Center mew, on 15 August 2015

In 2012, the center received and treated 145 birds, of which 40 were raptors and 105 non-raptors. Birds brought to the center were treated by an all volunteer staff, who kept them in their homes during the birds' treatment and rehabilitation. In addition, the center operated an education and viewing center at the top of the Mount Roberts Tramway. The small structure, independent of the main Tram building, included a shelter for birds too injured to release back into the wild, and a viewing platform for visitors. Center volunteers on duty answered questions from the public and provided information on the bird's life cycle, habitat, and the treatment which the bird had received.

== Diversity of bird species treated ==
Juneau Raptor Center staff treated and released a wide variety of birds over the years. Despite the Raptor Center's name, rescues were not limited to eagles or other birds of prey; the JRC staff accepted any species of bird brought to them for treatment.

In August 1998, Center staff were notified of a juvenile bald eagle which had collided with an automobile. The staff crated the bird, and took it to the home of a JRC volunteer, who found it to be uninjured.

On 3 May 2008, the Juneau Raptor Center released three bald eagles in a single day. The eagles, which Center staff named Truston, Gus and Pete, were all brought to the JRC on different dates and treated by staff members. The eagles' injuries ranged in severity, and included failure to thrive, torn muscle tissue, and "crop stasis", an inability to digest food. All were successfully treated and released.

In July 2010, children reported to the Center that they had found a hermit thrush stranded in the Mendenhall River and in danger of drowning. The uninjured but at risk thrush was cared for and fed by Center staff, who successfully released it two weeks later.

In August 2010 the JRC rescued three young barn swallows which had fallen out of a nest. Two of the swallows died, but the Center staff were able to save the third, which they named Clinger. Clinger was fed, treated, and successfully released into the wild.

== 2022 closure ==
In September 2022, the Juneau Raptor Center began phasing out all operations, beginning with its pager service that month. The JRC phone service and website ceased operation at the end of October, after which all birds in residence were transferred to the Alaska Raptor Center in Sitka at a later date. Final vacating of the JRC offices occurred by the end of 2022. Organizers cited a lack of volunteers as well as the COVID-19 pandemic and the effects of bird flu for the center's closure.

== See also ==
- Alaska Raptor Center
- Bird Treatment and Learning Center
- Lady Baltimore (bald eagle)
