= Lady Baltimore (eagle) =

Alaskan bald eagle (rescued 2006, died 2024)

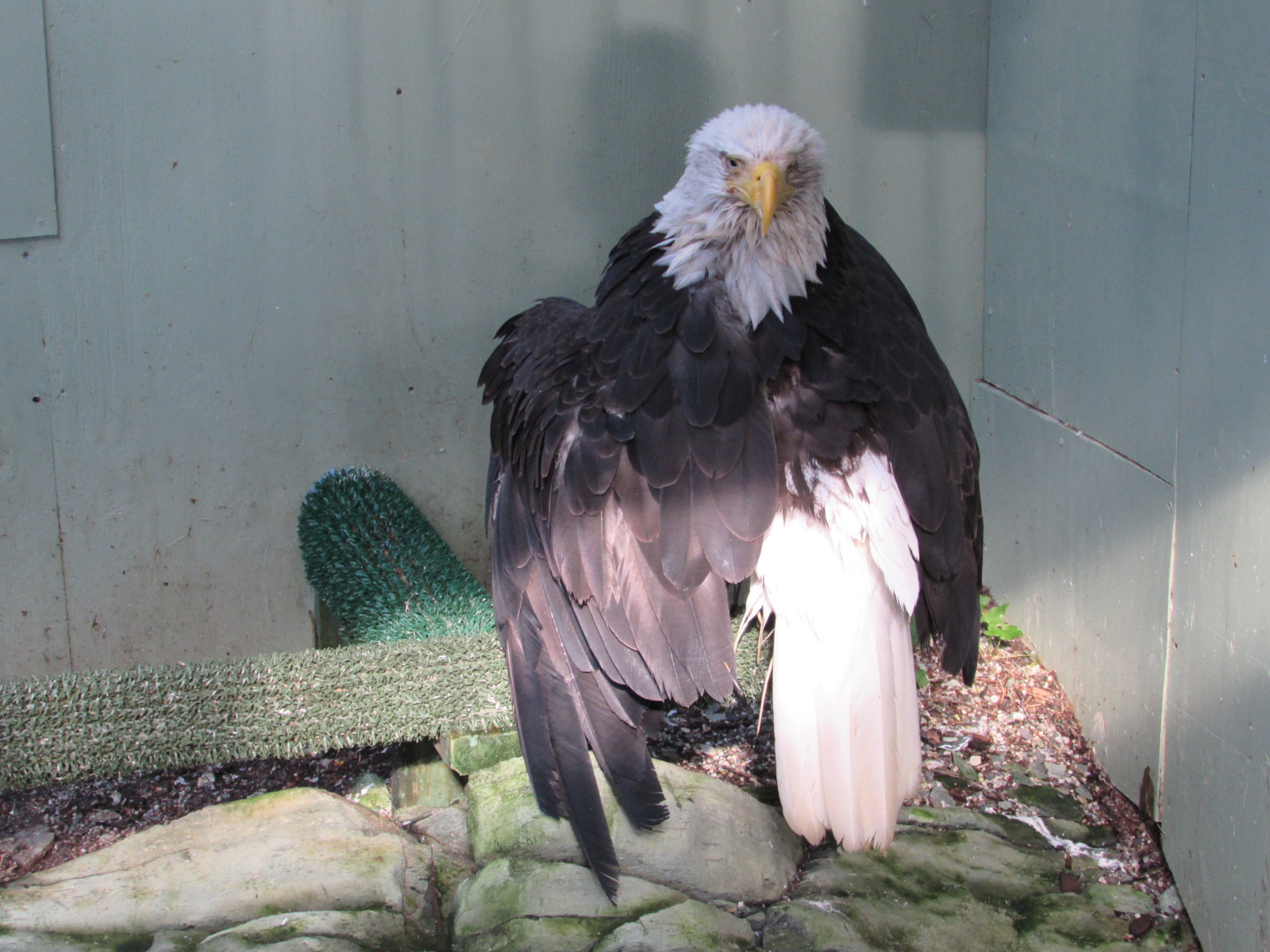
Lady Baltimore, in her Juneau Raptor Center mew, on August 15, 2015

Lady Baltimore was a non-releasable bald eagle in the care of the non-profit Juneau Raptor Center (JRC), in Juneau, Alaska. Lady Baltimore was found shot and injured on Alaska's Douglas Island in 2006. She had suffered injuries to her beak and one wing caused by a poacher. The injury to her beak caused the retina in her left eye to become detached, blinding her in that eye. Because of these injuries she had no depth perception, and could not be released into the wild.

== Life ==
Lady Baltimore's old mew, on August 15, 2015. Her habitat was upgraded in 2019.

Lady Baltimore was found after a failed poaching, which left her alive but severely injured. Volunteers with the Juneau Raptor Center rescued her, after an estimated 2 weeks of surviving her injuries on her own. JRC volunteers found her to be malnourished, and determined that she could not survive on her own, because her injuries caused her to aim her body poorly when flying and hunting. Since then, Lady Baltimore had been cared for year-round by JRC. During the summer tourist season she was put on display as an educational animal in a mew created and maintained by JRC, at the Mount Roberts Tramway on Mount Roberts.

== New habitat, and relocation ==
In 2019, the Mount Roberts Tramway and other donors paid for a new mew. The new habitat was larger, and provided better viewing for both visitors as well as the eagle.

However, in 2022, Lady Baltimore's host, the Juneau Raptor Center, ended operations. As a result, Lady Baltimore was moved along with one other eagle to the Alaska Raptor Center in Sitka.

== Death ==
In February 2024, staff at the Alaska Raptor Center discovered that Lady Baltimore's health had deteriorated to the point where she no longer had a good quality of life. She was subsequently euthanized.

== See also ==
- List of individual birds
