= Bird Treatment and Learning Center =

Wildlife rehabilitation center in Alaska, US

- Formation: 1988
- Founder: James R. Scott
- Headquarters: Anchorage, Alaska
- Website: www.birdtlc.org

The Bird Treatment and Learning Center (also known as Bird TLC) is a wildlife rehabilitation center based in Anchorage, Alaska. It was founded in the 1980s by a veterinarian James R. Scott, and some of its early activities were funded partially by money given to Scott by Exxon in the wake of the 1989 Exxon Valdez oil spill. The center started to move their operations to Potter Marsh in the second half of the 2010s.

== History ==
Bird TLC was established as the Bird Treatment and Learning Center in 1988 by veterinarian James R. Scott. It had previously been a part of Scott's Arctic Animal Hospital, but split into a separate entity due to high demand. In 1991, after the Exxon Valdez oil spill, Bird TLC built a temporary flight center in JBER to exercise injured birds and help them gain strength. The center was built with $102,000 Exxon gave to Scott, money which would also be used for the care of bald eagles. Using the money, Bird TLC and the Alaska Raptor Rehabilitation Center planned to work in tandem to care for injured raptors as part of a larger "eagle MASH operation" in the aftermath the oil spill. They received 24 bald eagles, out of which thirteen died and three were permanently injured.

In 2003 the center announced that they intended to use land at Potter Marsh to build a new flight and educational center. The proposed plans did not go ahead due to funding and scope issues, but in February 2016 Bird TLC was given permission by the municipality of Anchorage to build a flight center on the land. However, a bald eagle built a nest at the proposed sight and forced a delay in construction. Bird TLC had previously used the land to release rehabilitated birds, leading the organization to speculate that the bald eagle might have been cared for by them. Construction had resumed by 2017 and the center planned to finish moving to the new location in 2018.

The center accepted over 400 malnourished common murres during the 2016 common murre die-off, which strained their resources and volunteers. During the 2022 avian flue outbreak in Alaska, the center became one of the few in the state to continue accepting birds. They euthanized birds with severe symptoms, and kept the new intakes separated until they could be released. They took in birds from Valdez and Dutch Harbor. Some birds found outside of Anchorage have been flown to Bird TLC by Ravn Air which, as of 2015, donated flights to the center.

In June 2024 the center held a fundraiser inspired by Anchorage's white raven. Local photographers donated pictures and gave talks about their experiences with the raven. In February 2025, they held a fundraiser where people could pay $10 or $100, and have a mealworm or a rat named after an ex-partner and fed to one of the resident birds. The center raised $18,000 with the campaign.

== Facilities ==
In 1991, Bird TLC used money from Exxon to build a flight center at Fort Richardson. Built by volunteers, the flight center contained three flight pens, nine mews, and a medical exam room. It lacked running water and the organization did not own the land it was built on, so in the 2000s Bird TLC announced it would build a new flight center at Potter Marsh. Construction had started by 2017. The flight pens are used to let injured birds strengthen their wings. To encourage eagles to fly, volunteers are responsible for chasing them down the flight pens.

As of 2017, the center leased a warehouse in South Anchorage. The warehouse functioned as a clinic and a place for birds to live before transfer to the JBER flight center.

== Programs ==
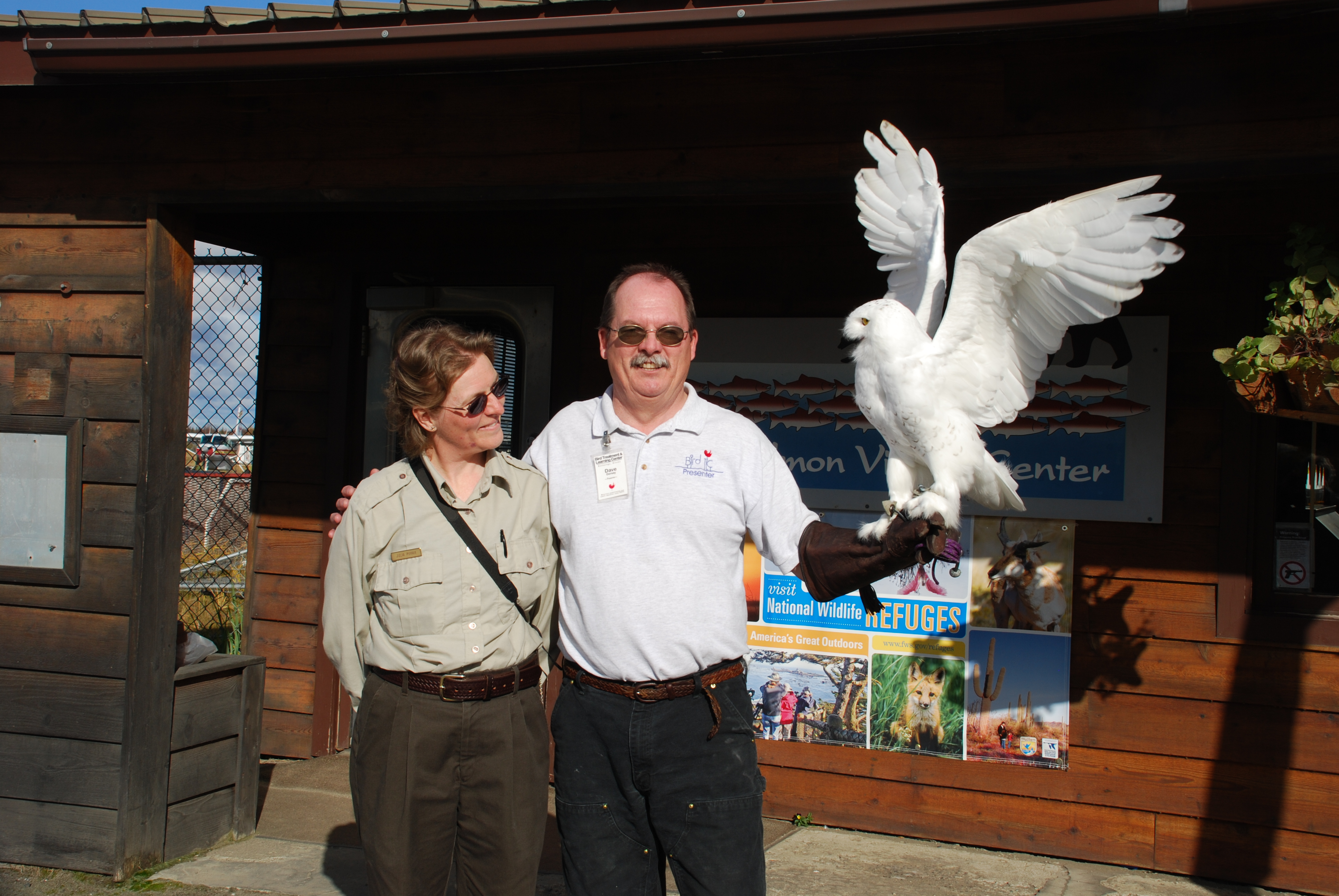
Bird TLC presentation of a snowy owl at the King Salmon Visitor Center in Katmai National Park and Preserve

Bird TLC has released rehabilitated bald eagles on multiple occasions during the annual Alaska Bald Eagle Festival.

Injured birds that are unable to be re-introduced into the wild stay with the center and some become Ambassador Birds. Birds that lived full time at the center have included Girdie, a North American crow who was found in Girdwood with an injured wing, Shavila, a black-billed magpie, and One Wing, a bald eagled injured during the Exxon Valdez oil spill. Ambassador Birds are taken to schools and events to allow the public to interact with them.

== See also ==
- Alaska Raptor Center
- Juneau Raptor Center

== Notes ==
1. The 1940 Bald and Golden Eagle Protection Act prohibits anybody from interfering with a bald eagle or bald eagle nest.

== Bibliography ==
- Scott, James R. (1991-04-15). "The veterinarian's role in the welfare of wildlife". Journal of the American Veterinary Medical Association. 198 (8): 1380–1385. doi:10.2460/javma.1991.198.08.1380. PMID 2061154.
