= Poaching =

Illegal hunting or fishing of wildlife

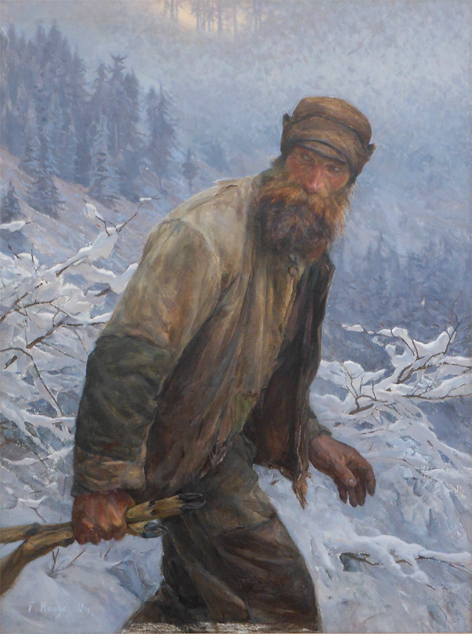
The Poacher (1908)

Poaching is the illegal hunting or capturing of wild animals, usually associated with land use rights. Poaching was once performed by impoverished peasants for subsistence purposes and to supplement meager diets. It was set against the hunting privileges of nobility and territorial rulers.

Since the 1980s, the term "poaching" has also been used to refer to the illegal harvesting of wild plants. In agricultural terms, the term 'poaching' is also applied to the loss of soils or grass by the damaging action of feet of livestock, which can affect availability of productive land, water pollution through increased runoff and welfare issues for cattle. Stealing livestock, as in cattle raiding, classifies as theft rather than poaching.

The United Nations' Sustainable Development Goal 15 enshrines the sustainable use of all wildlife. It targets the taking of action on dealing with poaching and trafficking of protected species of flora and fauna to ensure their availability for present and future generations.

== Legal aspects ==
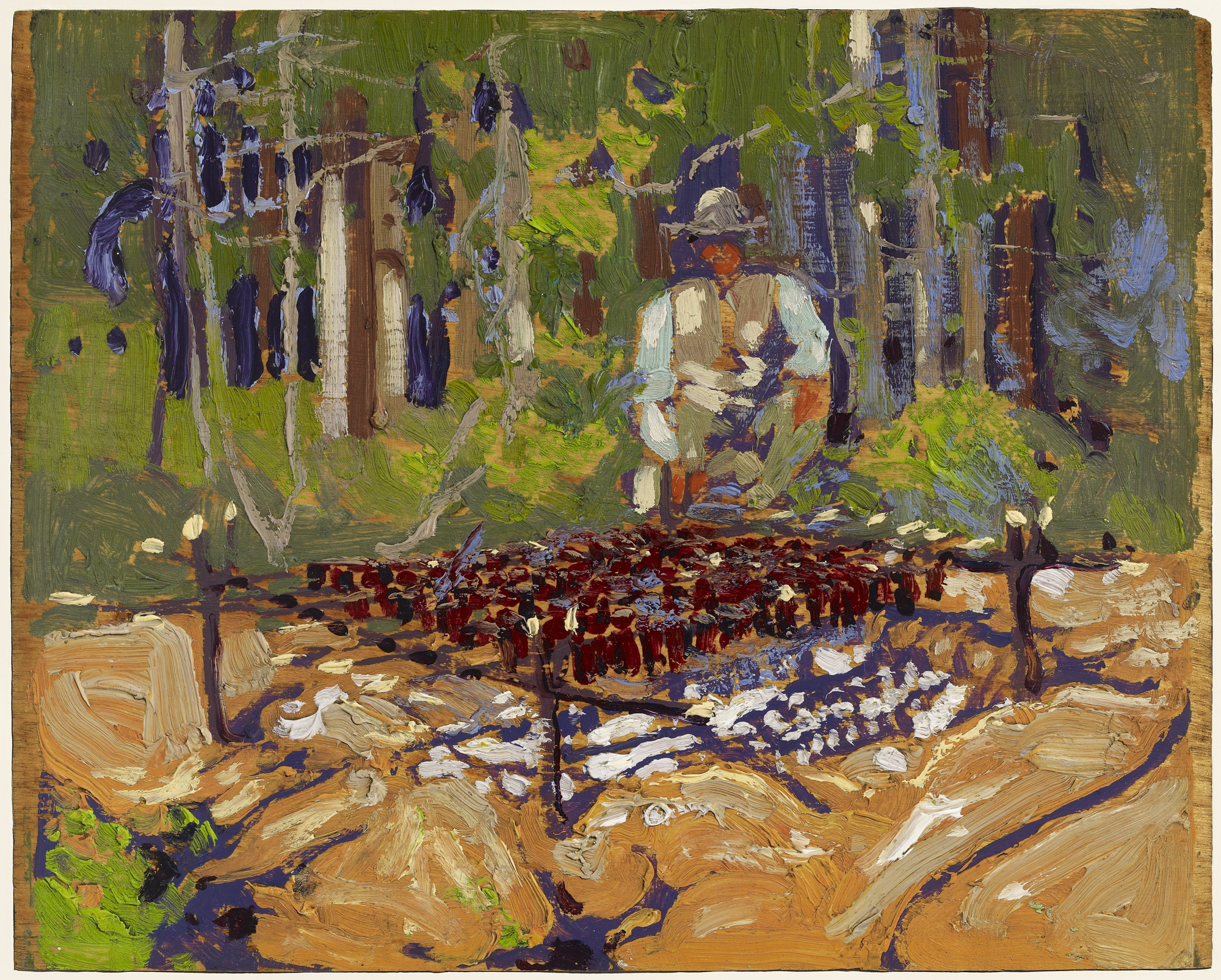
The Poacher, 1916 sketch by Tom Thomson, Art Gallery of Ontario, Toronto

In 1998, environmental scientists from the University of Massachusetts Amherst proposed the concept of poaching as an environmental crime and defined as any illegal activity that contravenes the laws and regulations established to protect renewable natural resources, including the illegal harvest of wildlife with the intention of possessing, transporting, consuming or selling it and using its body parts. They considered poaching as one of the most serious threats to the survival of plant and animal populations. Wildlife biologists and conservationists consider poaching to have a detrimental effect on biodiversity both within and outside protected areas as wildlife populations decline, species are depleted locally, and the functionality of ecosystems is disturbed.

=== Continental Europe ===
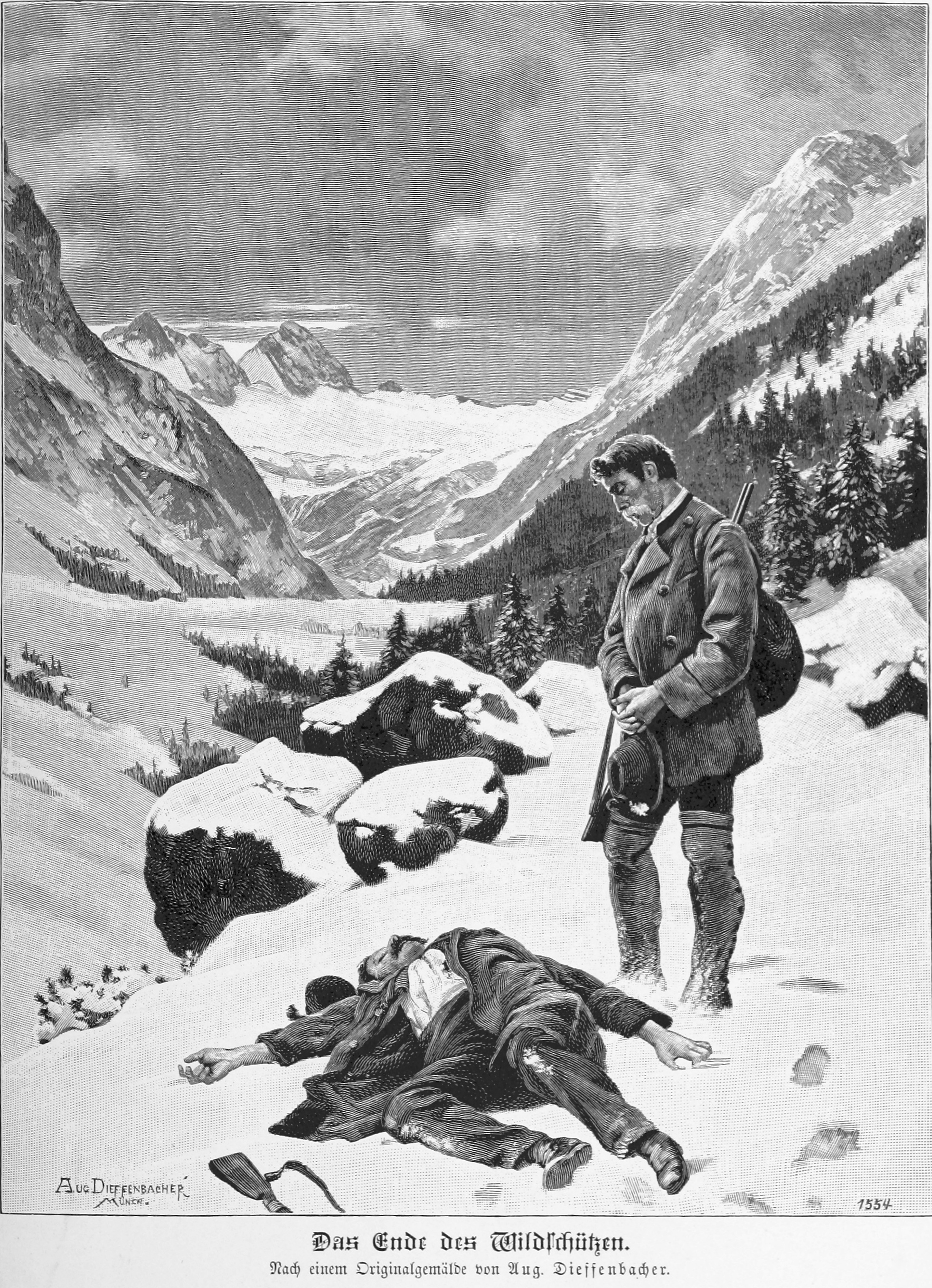
End of the poacher, illustration based on a painting by August Dieffenbacher, 1894

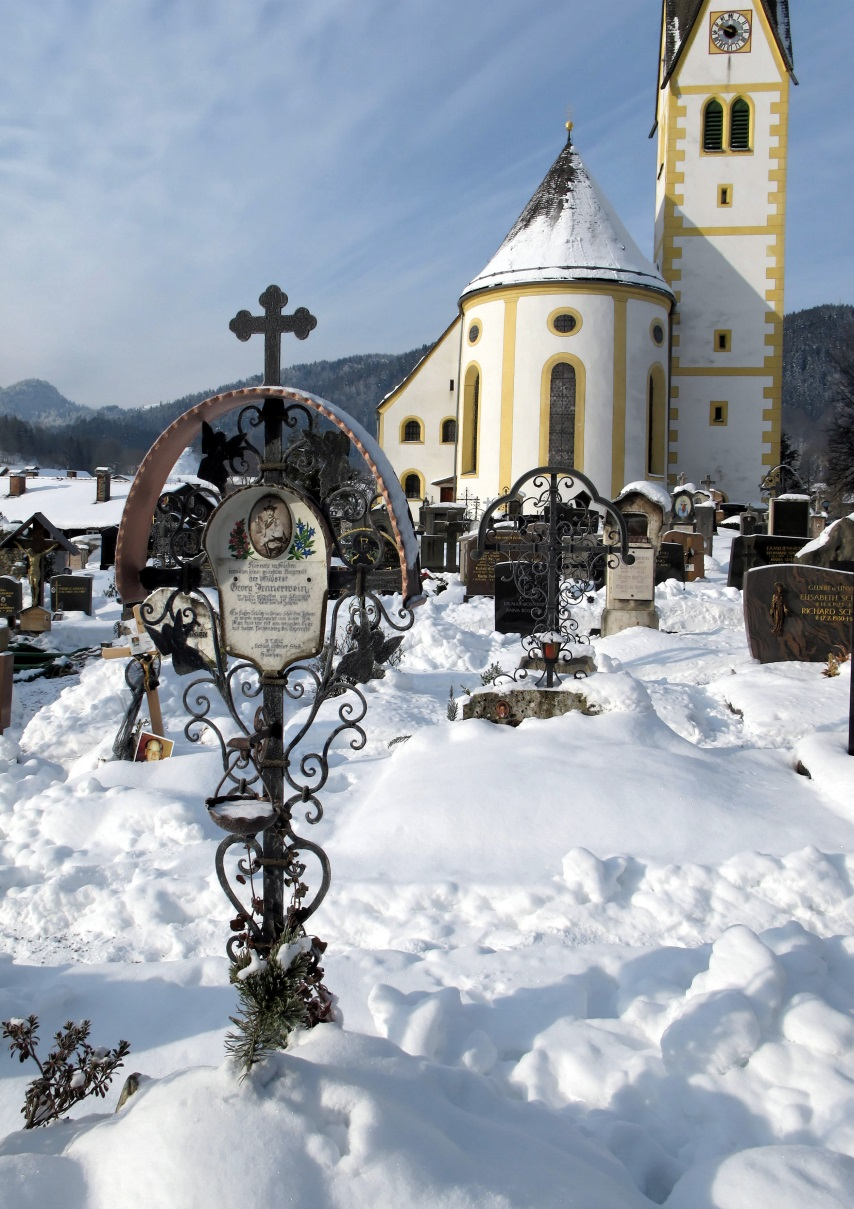
Grave of a poacher in Schliersee, quoting the first stanza of the Jennerwein song. Now and then, poached game is being placed on the grave to commemorate 'Girgl'.

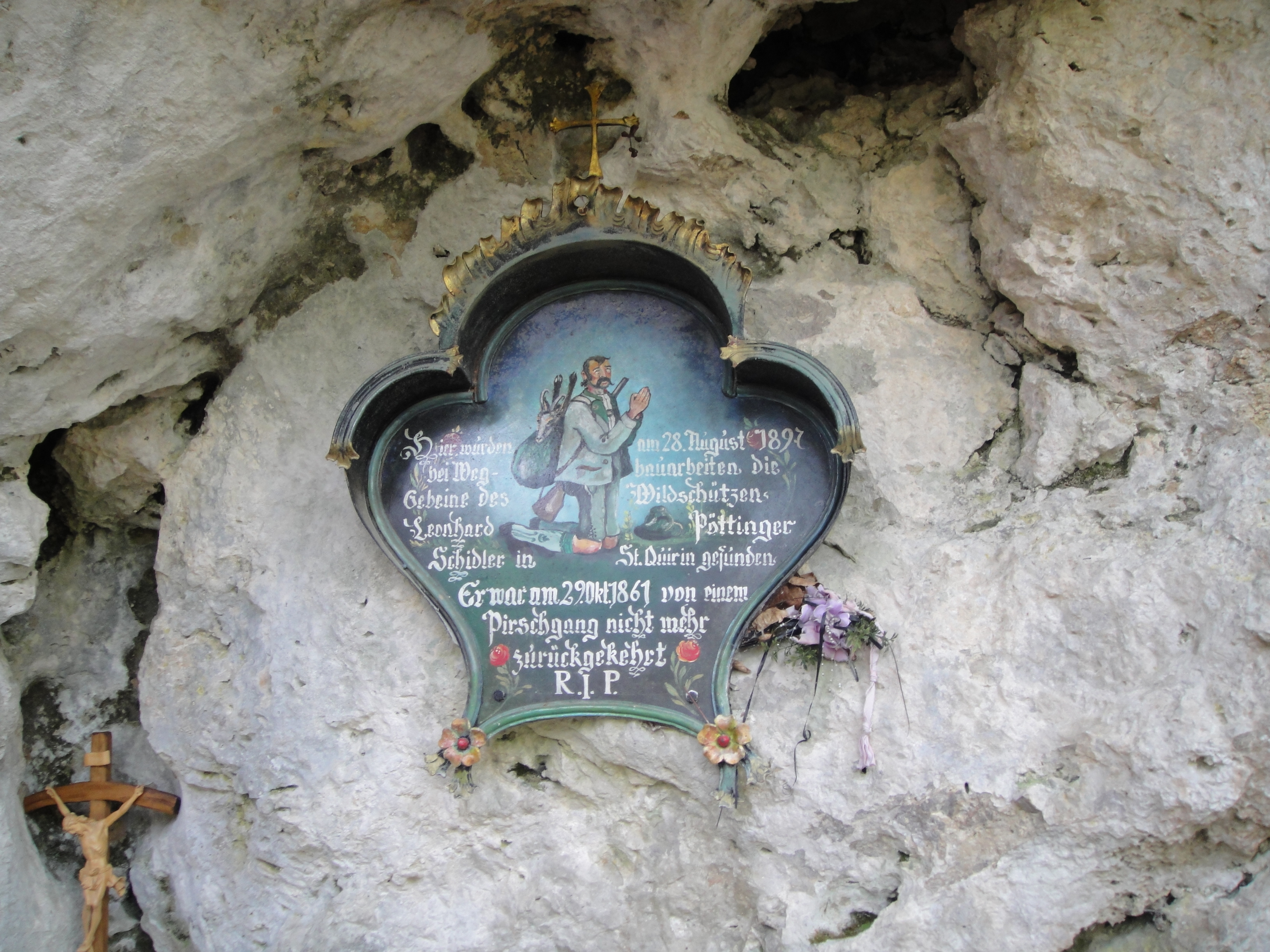
Marterl at the Riederstein, near Baumgartenschneid, Tegernsee. The remains of a poacher, who had never returned from a hunting expedition in 1861, were found at the site in 1897.

Austria and Germany refer to poaching not as theft but as intrusion into third-party hunting rights. While ancient Germanic law allowed any free man, including peasants, to hunt, especially on common land, Roman law restricted hunting to the rulers. In medieval Europe rulers of feudal territories from the king downward tried to enforce exclusive rights of the nobility to hunt and fish on the lands that they ruled. Poaching was deemed a serious crime punishable by imprisonment, but enforcement was comparably weak until the 16th century. Peasants were still allowed to continue small game hunting, but the right of the nobility to hunt was restricted in the 16th century and transferred to land ownership. The low quality of guns made it necessary to approach the game as close as 30 m (98 ft). Poachers in the Salzburg region were typically unmarried men around 30 years of age and usually alone on their illegal trade.

The development of modern hunting rights is closely connected to the comparatively modern idea of exclusive private ownership of land. In the 17th and the 18th centuries, the restrictions on hunting and shooting rights on private property were enforced by gamekeepers and foresters. They denied shared usage of forests, such as resin collection and wood pasture and the peasants right to hunt and fish. However, by end of the 18th century, comparably-easy access to rifles increasingly allowed peasants and servants to poach. Hunting was used in the 18th century as a theatrical demonstration of the aristocratic rule of the land and also had a strong impact on land use patterns. Poaching not only interfered with property rights but also clashed symbolically with the power of the nobility. Between 1830 and 1848, poaching and poaching-related deaths increased in Bavaria. The German revolutions of 1848–49 were interpreted as a general permission for poaching in Bavaria. The reform of the hunting law in 1849 restricted legal hunting to rich landowners and middle classes who could pay hunting fees, which led to disappointment among the general public, who continued to view poachers favourably. Some of the frontier regions, where smuggling was important, showed especially strong resistance to that development. In 1849, the Bavarian military forces were asked to occupy a number of municipalities on the frontier with Austria. Both in Wallgau (now part of Garmisch-Partenkirchen) and in Lackenhäuser, in the Bavarian forest, each household had to feed and accommodate one soldier for a month as part of a military mission to quell the disturbance. The people of Lackenhäuser had several skirmishes with Austrian foresters and military that started due to poached deer. The well-armed people set against the representatives of the state were known as bold poachers (kecke Wilderer). Some poachers and their violent deaths, like Matthias Klostermayr (1736–1771), Georg Jennerwein (1848–1877) and Pius Walder (1952–1982) gained notoriety and have had a strong cultural impact, which has persisted until today. Poaching was used as a dare. It had a certain erotic connotation, as in Franz Schubert's Hunter's love song, (1828, Schubert Thematic Catalogue 909). The lyrics of Franz von Schober connected unlimited hunting with the pursuit of love. Further poaching related legends and stories ranged from the 1821 opera Freischütz to Wolfgang Franz von Kobell's 1871 story about the Brandner Kasper, a Tegernsee locksmith and poacher who struck a special deal with the Grim Reaper. While poachers had strong local support until the early 20th century, Walder's case showed a significant change in attitudes. Urban citizens still had some sympathy for the hillbilly rebel, but the local community was much supportive.

=== United Kingdom ===
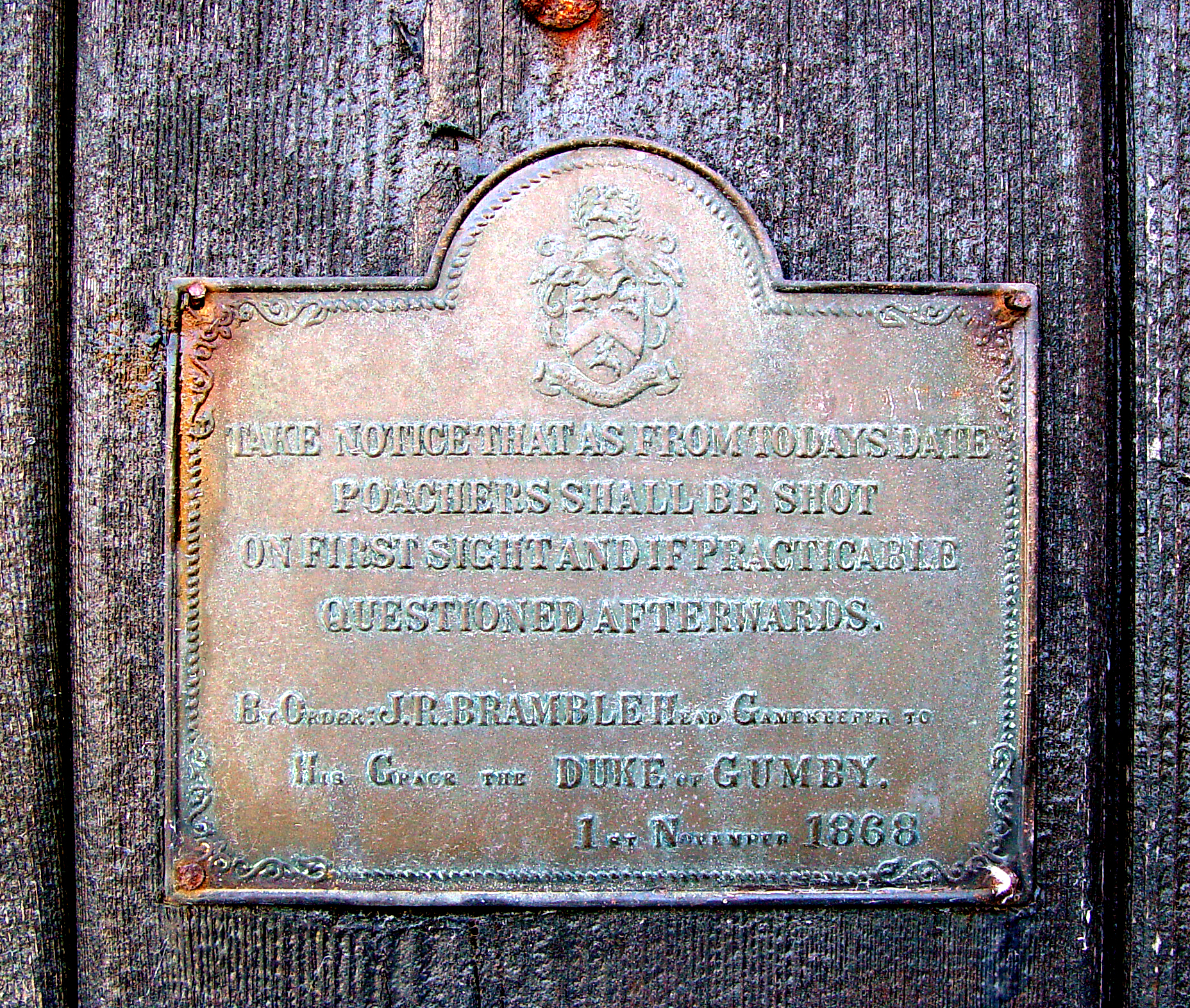
Brass plaque on door at Tremedda farm dating to 1868, warning that poachers shall be shot on first sight

Poaching, like smuggling, has a long history in the United Kingdom. The verb poach is derived from the Middle English word pocchen literally meaning bagged, enclosed in a bag, which is cognate with "pouch". Poaching was dispassionately reported for England in "Pleas of the Forest", transgressions of the rigid Anglo-Norman forest law. William the Conqueror, who was a great lover of hunting, established and enforced a system of forest law. This system operated outside the common law and served to protect game animals and their forest habitat from hunting by the common people of England, while reserving hunting rights for the new French-speaking Anglo-Norman aristocracy. Henceforth, hunting of game in royal forests by commoners was punishable by hanging. In 1087, the poem "The Rime of King William", contained in the Peterborough Chronicle, expressed English indignation at the severe new laws. Poaching was romanticised in literature from the time of the ballads of Robin Hood, as an aspect of the "greenwood" of Merry England. In one tale, Robin Hood is depicted as offering King Richard the Lion Heart venison from deer that was illegally hunted in the Sherwood Forest, the King overlooking the fact that this hunting was a capital offence. The widespread acceptance of the common criminal activity is encapsulated in the observation Non est inquirendum, unde venit venison ("It is not to be inquired, whence comes the venison") that was made by Guillaume Budé in his Traitte de la vénerie. However, the English nobility and land owners were in the long term extremely successful in enforcing the modern concept of property, such as expressed in the enclosures of common land and later in the Highland Clearances, both of which were forced displacement of people from traditional land tenancies and erstwhile-common land. The 19th century saw the rise of acts of legislation, such as the Night Poaching Act 1828 and the Game Act 1831 (1 & 2 Will. 4. c. 32) in the United Kingdom, and various laws elsewhere.

=== United States ===
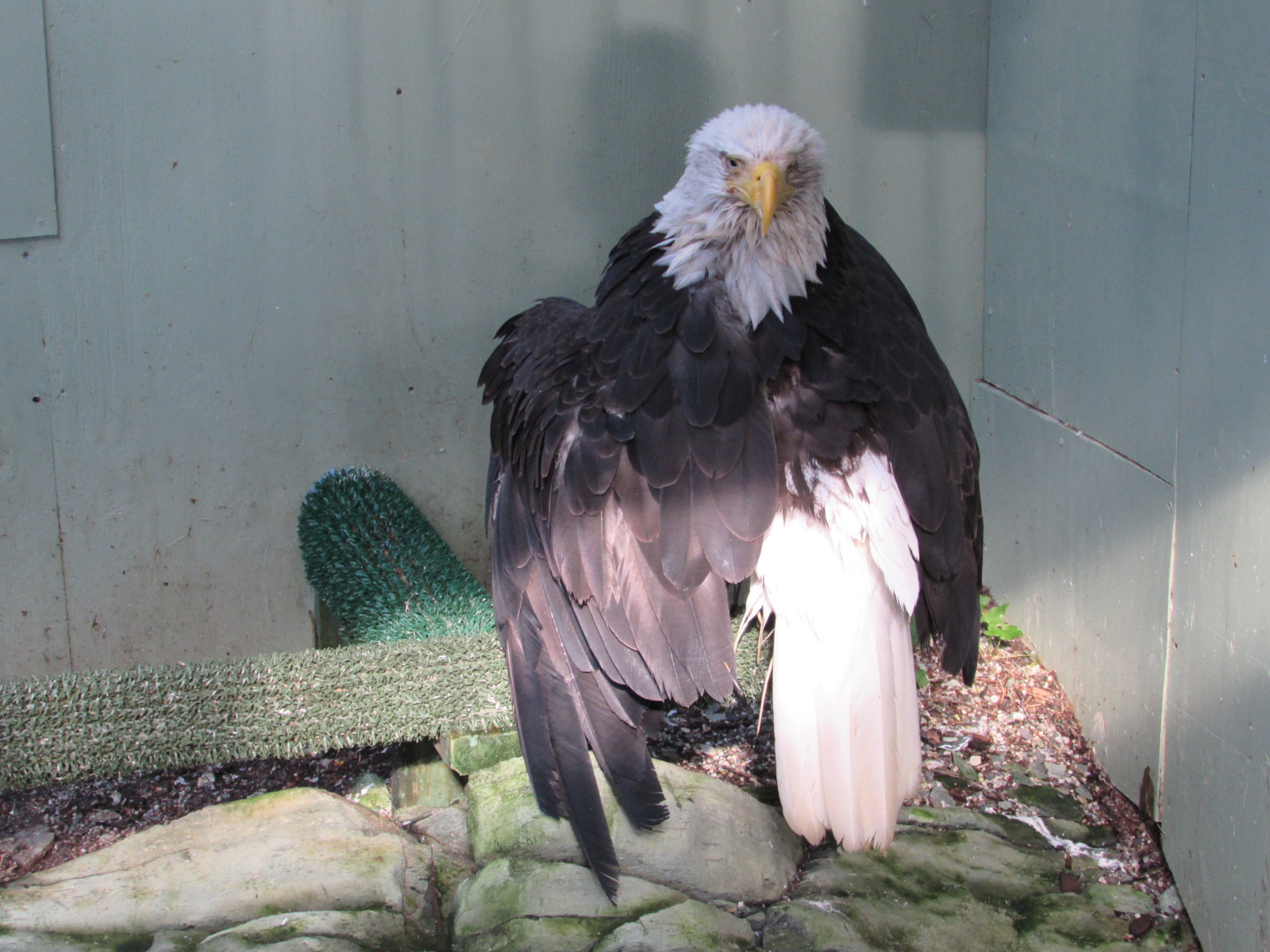
Lady Baltimore, a bald eagle in Alaska survived a poaching attempt in the Juneau Raptor Center mews on 15 August 2015

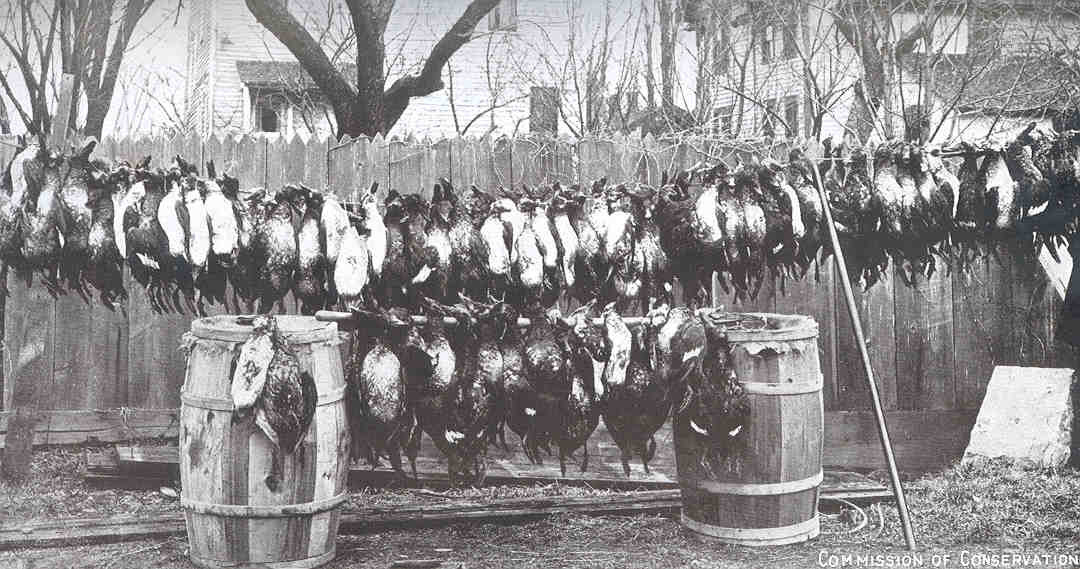
Poached ducks in Lake Ontario, 1915.

In North America, the blatant defiance of the laws by poachers escalated to armed conflicts with law authorities, including the Oyster Wars of the Chesapeake Bay and the joint US-British Bering Sea Anti-Poaching Operations of 1891 over the hunting of seals. In the Chesapeake Bay in the 1930s one of the biggest threats to waterfowl was local poachers using flat boats with swivel cannons that killed entire flocks with one shot.

Violations of hunting laws and regulations concerning wildlife management, local or international wildlife conservation schemes constitute wildlife crimes that are typically punishable. The following violations and offenses are considered acts of poaching in the US:

- Hunting, killing or collecting wildlife that is listed as endangered by the IUCN and protected by law such as the Endangered Species Act, the Migratory Bird Treaty Act of 1918 and international treaties such as CITES.
- Fishing and hunting without a license.
- Capturing wildlife outside legal hours and outside the hunting season; usually the breeding season is declared as the closed season during which wildlife is protected by law;
- Canned hunting;
- Prohibited use of machine guns, poison, explosives, snare traps, nets and pitfall traps.
- Other offenses of incorrect weaponry, such as the use of cartridge rifles in muzzleloader or archery season or in shotgun-only areas, or the killing of big game animals with insufficient firepower such as .22 Long Rifle rounds.
- Prohibited use of baiting with food, decoys or recorded calls to increase chances for shooting wildlife.
- Hunting from a moving vehicle or aircraft.
- Scouting game animals from an aircraft.
- Spotlighting, or shining animals with a spotlight at night to impair their natural defences and thus facilitate an easy kill, is considered animal abuse. This hunting method is illegal in California, Virginia, Connecticut, Florida, Michigan, New Hampshire, Maine, Texas, and Tennessee.
- Night Hunting;
- Trespassing;
- Taking wildlife on land that is restricted, owned by, or licensed to somebody else.
- The animal or plant has been tagged by a researcher.
- Taking females and juveniles.
- Hunting or fishing over limit.

=== Africa ===
In 2008, efforts to combat rhino poaching in Kruger National Park were bolstered by a new aerial surveillance solution in cooperation with the Ichikowitz Family Foundation and South African National Parks (SANParks). A specialist reconnaissance aircraft, The Seeker Seabird, incorporating sophisticated surveillance technology, was introduced to accomplish this goal.

In 2015, Stephen Corry, director of the human rights group Survival International, argued that the term "poaching" has been used to criminalize the traditional subsistence techniques of indigenous peoples and to bar them from hunting on their ancestral lands when they are declared as wildlife-only zones. Corry argues that parks such as the Central Kalahari Game Reserve are managed for the benefit of foreign tourists and safari groups at the expense of the livelihoods of tribal peoples such as the Kalahari bushmen.

== Motives ==
Sociological and criminological research on poaching indicates that in North America people poach for commercial gain, home consumption, trophies, pleasure, and thrill in killing wildlife or because they disagree with certain hunting regulations, claim a traditional right to hunt, or have negative dispositions toward legal authority. In rural areas of the United States, the key motives for poaching are poverty. Interviews conducted with 41 poachers in the Atchafalaya River basin in Louisiana revealed that 37 of them hunt to provide food for themselves and their families; 11 stated that poaching is part of their personal or cultural history; nine earn money from the sale of poached game to support their families; and eight feel exhilarated and thrilled by outsmarting game wardens.

In rural areas in Africa, the key motives for poaching are the lack of employment opportunities and a limited potential for agriculture and livestock production. Poor people rely on natural resources for their survival and generate cash income through the sale of bushmeat, which attracts high prices in urban centres. Body parts of wildlife are also in demand for traditional medicine and ceremonies. The existence of an international market for poached wildlife implies that well-organised gangs of professional poachers enter vulnerable areas to hunt, and crime syndicates organise the trafficking of wildlife body parts through a complex interlinking network to markets outside the respective countries of origin. Armed conflict in Africa has been linked to intensified poaching and wildlife declines within protected areas, likely reflecting the disruption of traditional livelihoods, which causes people to seek alternative food sources.

Results of an interview survey conducted in several villages in Tanzania indicate that one of the major reasons of poaching is for consumption and sale of bushmeat. Usually, bushmeat is considered a subset of poaching because of the hunting of animals regardless of the laws that conserve certain species of animals. Many families consume more bushmeat if there are no alternative sources of protein available such as fish. The further the families were from the reserve, the less likely they were to illegally hunt wildlife for bushmeat. They were more likely to hunt for bushmeat right before the harvest season and during heavy rains, as before the harvest season, there is not much agricultural work, and heavy rainfall obscures human tracks and makes it easier for poachers to get away with their crimes.

Poverty seems to be a large impetus to cause people to poach, something that affects both residents in Africa and Asia. For example, in Thailand, there are anecdotal accounts of the desire for a better life for children, which drive rural poachers to take the risk of poaching even though they dislike exploiting the wildlife.

Another major cause of poaching is the cultural high demand of wildlife products, such as ivory, which are seen as symbols of status and wealth in China. According to Joseph Vandegrift, China saw an unusual spike in demand for ivory in the 21st century because the economic boom allowed more middle-class Chinese to have a higher purchasing power, which incentivized them to show off their newfound wealth by using ivory, which has been a rare commodity since the Han dynasty.

In China, there are problems with wildlife conservation, specifically relating to tigers. Several authors collaborated on the piece "Public attitude toward tiger farming and tiger conservation in Beijing, China", and explored the option of whether it would be a better policy to raise tigers on a farm or put them in a wildlife conservation habitat to preserve the species. Conducting a survey on 1,058 residents of Beijing, China, with 381 being university students and the other 677 being regular citizens, they tried to gauge public opinion about tigers and conservation efforts for them. They were asked questions regarding the value of tigers in relations to ecology, science, education, aestheticism, and culture. However, one reason emerged as to why tigers are still highly demanded in illegal trading: culturally, they are still status symbols of wealth for the upper class, and they are still thought to have mysterious medicinal and healthcare effects.

== Effects ==
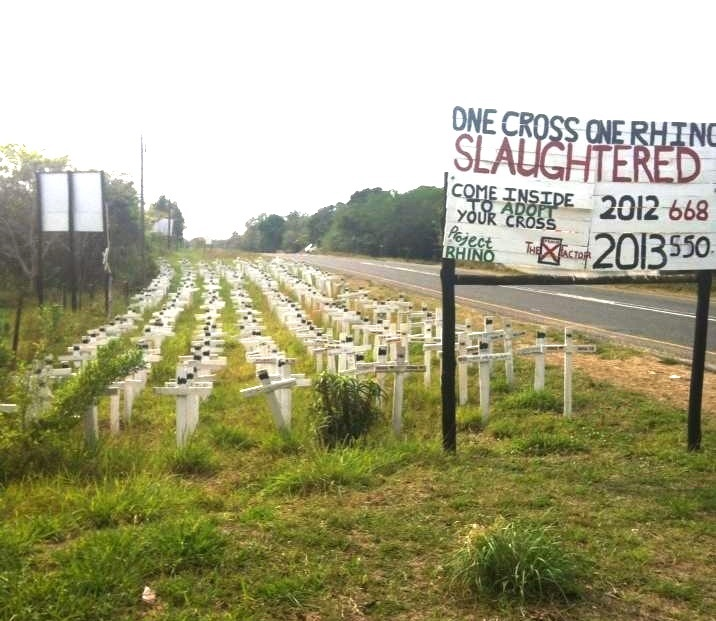
Memorial to rhinos killed by poachers near St Lucia Estuary, South Africa

The detrimental effects of poaching can include:

- Defaunation of forests: predators, herbivores and fruit-eating vertebrates cannot recover as fast as they are removed from a forest; as their populations decline, the pattern of seed predation and dispersal is altered; tree species with large seeds progressively dominate a forest, while small-seeded plant species become locally extinct.
- Reduction of animal populations in the wild and possible extinction.
- The effective size of protected areas is reduced as poachers use the edges of these areas as open-access resources.
- Wildlife tourism destinations face a negative publicity; those holding a permit for wildlife-based land uses, tourism-based tour and lodging operators lose income; employment opportunities are reduced.
- Emergence of zoonotic diseases caused by transmission of highly variable retrovirus chains:
  - Outbreaks of the Ebola virus in the Congo Basin and in Gabon in the 1990s have been associated with the butchering of apes and consumption of their meat.
  - The outbreak of SARS in Hong Kong is attributed to contact with and consumption of meat from masked palm civets, raccoon dogs, Chinese ferret-badgers and other small carnivores that are available in southern Chinese wildlife markets.
  - Bushmeat hunters in Central Africa infected with the human T-lymphotropic virus were closely exposed to wild primates.
  - Results of research on wild central chimpanzees in Cameroon indicate that they are naturally infected with the simian foamy virus and constitute a reservoir of HIV-1, a precursor of the acquired immunodeficiency syndrome in humans.

== Products ==
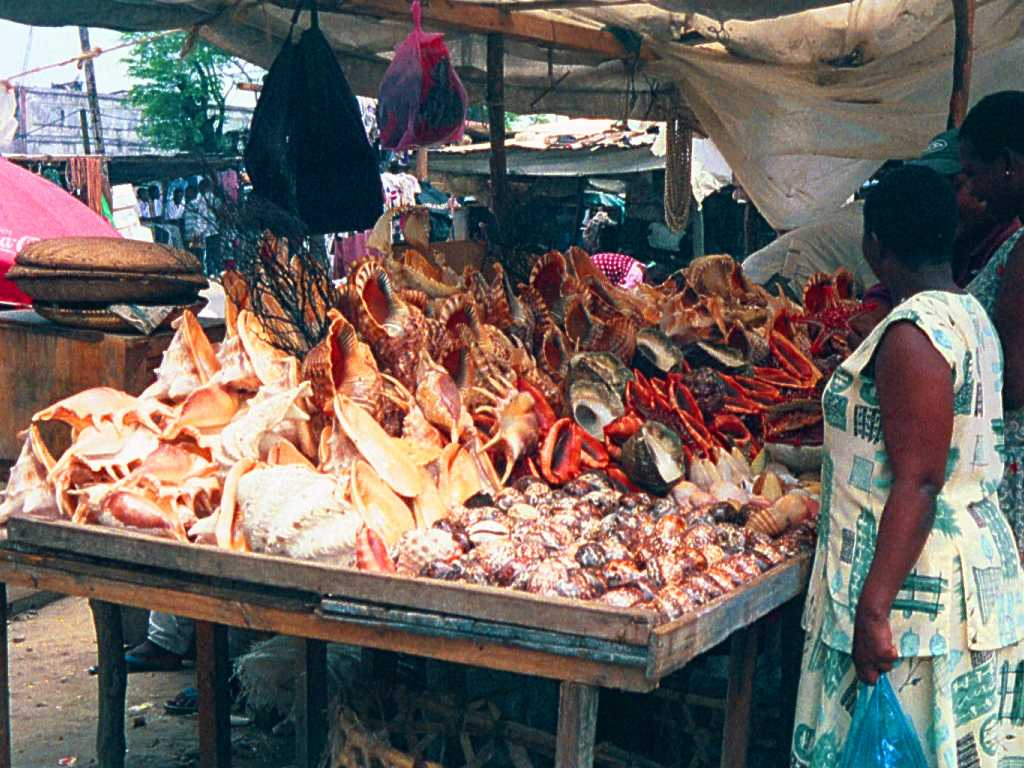
A seashell vendor in Tanzania sells seashells to tourists, seashells which have been taken from the sea alive, killing the animal inside.

The body parts of many animals, such as tigers and rhinoceroses, are traditionally believed in some cultures to have certain positive effects on the human body, including increasing virility and curing cancer. These parts are sold in areas where these beliefs are practiced – mostly Asian countries, particularly Vietnam and China – on the black market. Such alternative medical beliefs are pseudoscientific and are not supported by evidence-based medicine.

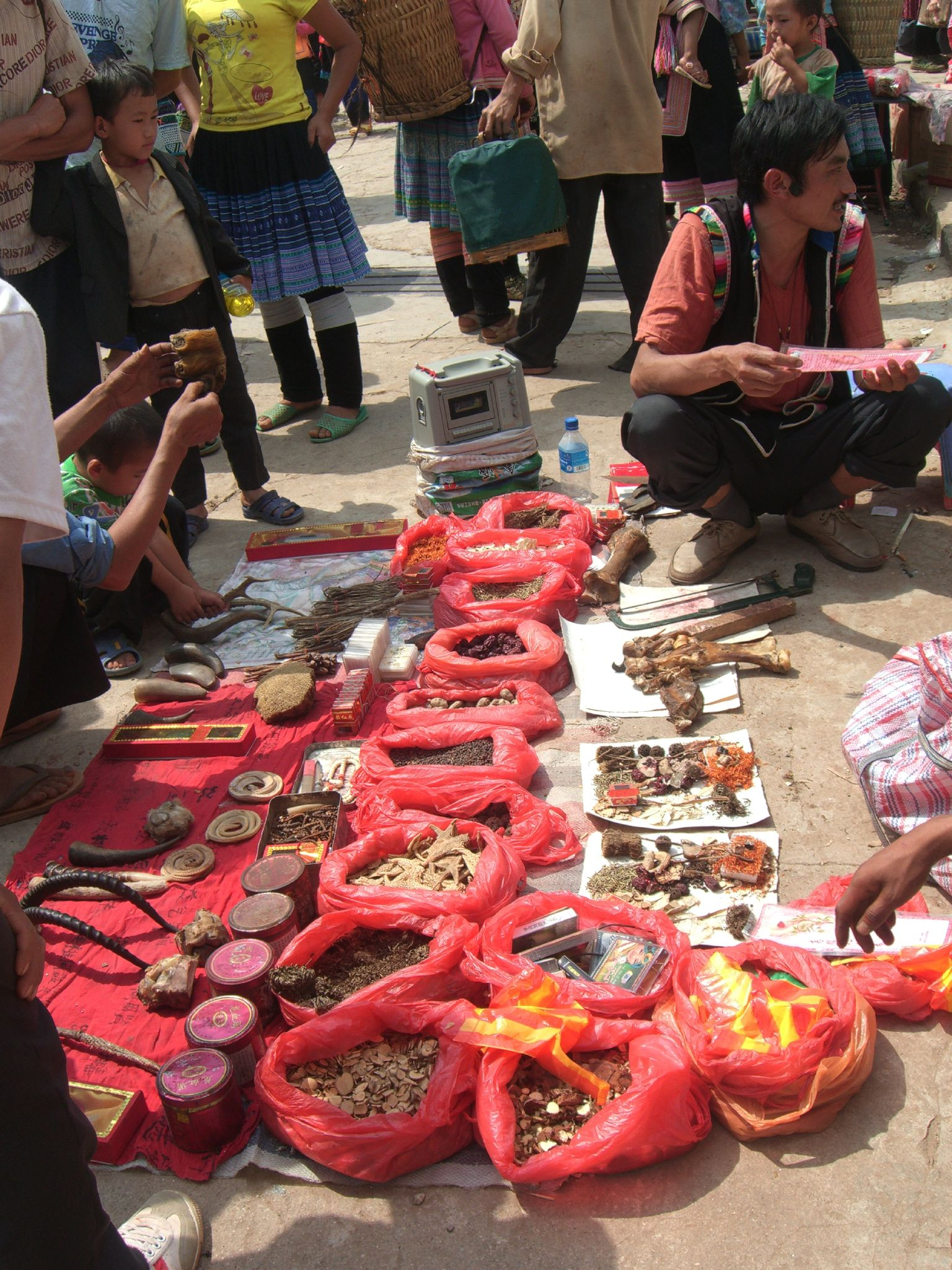
A vendor selling illegal items at a Chinese market for use in traditional Chinese medicine. Some of the pieces pictured include parts of animals such as a tiger's paw.

Traditional Chinese medicine often incorporates ingredients from all parts of plants, the leaf, stem, flower, root, and also ingredients from animals and minerals. The use of parts of endangered species (such as seahorses, rhinoceros horns, binturong, pangolin scales and tiger bones and claws) has created controversy and resulted in a black market of poachers. Deep-seated cultural beliefs in the potency of tiger parts are so prevalent across China and other east Asian countries that laws protecting even critically endangered species such as the Sumatran tiger fail to stop the display and sale of these items in open markets, according to a 2008 report from TRAFFIC. Popular "medicinal" tiger parts from poached animals include tiger genitals, believed to improve virility, and tiger eyes.

Rhino populations face extinction because of demand in Asia (for traditional medicine and as a luxury item) and in the Middle East (where horns are used for decoration). A sharp surge in demand for rhino horn in Vietnam was attributed to rumors that the horn cured cancer, though this has no basis in science. In 2012, one kilogram of crushed rhino horn has sold for as much as $60,000, more expensive than a kilogram of gold. Vietnam is the only nation which mass-produces bowls made for grinding rhino horn.

Ivory, which is a natural material of several animals, plays a large part in the trade of illegal animal materials and poaching. Ivory is a material used in creating art objects and jewelry where the ivory is carved with designs. China is a consumer of the ivory trade and accounts for a significant amount of ivory sales. In 2012, The New York Times reported on a large upsurge in ivory poaching, with about 70% of all illegal ivory flowing to China.

Fur is also a natural material which is sought after by poachers. A Gamsbart, literally chamois beard, a tuft of hair traditionally worn as a decoration on trachten-hats in the alpine regions of Austria and Bavaria formerly was worn as a hunting (and poaching) trophy. In the past, it was made exclusively from hair from the chamois' lower neck.

== Anti-poaching efforts ==
There are different anti-poaching efforts around the world. Some research suggests that such work may be more effective at improving populations affected by poaching than protected area expansion. Insufficient enforcement was found to reduce the effectiveness of anti-poaching approaches.

=== Africa ===
The Traffic conservation programme brings to light many of the poaching areas and trafficking routes and helps to clamp down on the smuggling routes the poachers use to get the ivory to areas of high demand, predominantly Asia.

As many as 35,000 African elephants are slaughtered yearly to feed the demand for their ivory tusks. This ivory then goes on to be used in jewelry, musical instruments, and other trinkets.

Members of the Rhino Rescue Project have implemented a technique to combat rhino poaching in South Africa by injecting a mixture of indelible dye and a parasiticide into the animals' horns, which enables tracking of the horns and deters consumption of the horn by purchasers. Since rhino horn is made of keratin, advocates say the procedure is painless for the animal.

Another strategy being used to counter rhino poachers in Africa is called RhODIS, which is a database that compiles rhino DNA from confiscated horns and other goods that were being illegally traded, as well as DNA recovered from poaching sites. RhODIS cross-references the DNA as it searches for matches; if a match is found, it is used to track down the poachers.

Africa's Wildlife Trust seeks to protect African elephant populations from poaching activities in Tanzania. Hunting for ivory was banned in 1989, but poaching of elephants continues in many parts of Africa stricken by economic decline. The International Anti-Poaching Foundation has a structured military-like approach to conservation, employing tactics and technology generally reserved for the battlefield. Founder Damien Mander is an advocate of the use of military equipment and tactics, including Unmanned Aerial Vehicles, for military-style anti-poaching operations. Such military-style approaches have been criticised for failing to resolve the underlying reasons for poaching, but to neither tackle "the role of global trading networks" nor the continued demand for animal products. Instead, they "result in coercive, unjust and counterproductive approaches to wildlife conservation".

Chengeta Wildlife is an organization that works to equip and train wildlife protection teams and lobbies African governments to adopt anti-poaching campaigns. Jim Nyamu's elephant walks are part of attempts in Kenya to reduce ivory poaching.

In 2013, the Tanzanian Minister of Natural Resources and Tourism urged that poachers be shot on sight in an effort to stop the mass killing of elephants. Since December 2016, anti-poaching police units in Namibia are permitted to return fire on poachers if fired upon. The government of Botswana adopted a shoot-to-kill policy against poachers in 2013 as a "legitimate conservation strategy" and "a necessary evil", which has reduced poaching to the point it is thought to be "virtually non-existent" in the country, and that neighbouring countries like South Africa should also adopt similar measures to save wildlife from extinction. In May 2018, the Kenyan government announced that poachers will face the death penalty, as fines and life imprisonment have "not been deterrence enough to curb poaching, hence the proposed stiffer sentence". Human rights organizations oppose the move, but wildlife advocates support it. Save the Rhino, a UK-based wildlife advocacy organization notes that in Kenya, 23 rhinos and 156 elephants were killed by poachers between 2016 and 2017. As of March 2019, the measure is being put on the fast track to implementation by Kenyan lawmakers.

=== Asia ===
Large quantities of ivory are sometimes destroyed as a statement against poaching, known as an "ivory crush". In 2013 the Philippines were the first country to destroy their national seized ivory stock. In 2014, China followed suit and crushed six tons of ivory as a symbolic statement against poaching.

Frederick Chen has stated that there are two main solutions to attack the supply side of poaching to reduce its effects: enforcing and enacting more policies and laws for conservation, and encouraging local communities to protect the wildlife around them by giving them more land rights.

Nonetheless, Chen wrote about two types of effects stemming from demand-side economics: the bandwagon and snob effect. The former deals with people desiring a product due to many other people buying it, while the latter is similar but with one distinct difference: people will clamour to buy something if it denotes wealth that only a few elites could possibly afford. Therefore, the snob effect would offset some of the gains made by anti-poaching laws, regulations, or practices: if a portion of the supply is cut off, the rarity and price of the object would increase, and only a select few would have the desire and purchasing power for it. While approaches to dilute mitigate poaching from a supply-side may not be the best option as people can become more willing to purchase rarer items, especially in countries gaining more wealth and therefore higher demand for illicit goods—Frederick Chen still advocates that we should also focus on exploring ways to reduce the demand for these goods to better stop the problem of poaching. Indeed, there is some evidence that interventions to reduce consumer demand may be more effective for combatting poaching than continually increased policing to catch poachers. However, almost no groups deploying interventions that attempt to reduce consumer demand evaluate the impact of their actions.

Another solution to alleviate poaching proposed in Tigers of the World was about how to implement a multi-lateral strategy that targets different parties to conserve wild tiger populations in general. This multi-lateral approach include working with different agencies to fight and prevent poaching since organized crime syndicates benefit from tiger poaching and trafficking; therefore, there is a need to raise social awareness and implement more protection and investigative techniques. For example, conservation groups raised more awareness amongst park rangers and the local communities to understand the impact of tiger poaching—they achieved this through targeted advertising that would impact the main audience. Targeting advertising using more violent imagery to show the disparity between tigers in nature and as a commodity made a great impact on the general population to combat poaching and indifference towards this problem. The use of spokespeople such as Jackie Chan and other famous Asian actors and models who advocated against poaching also helped the conservation movement for tigers too.

In July 2019, rhino horns encased in plaster were seized in Vietnam that were being trafficked from the United Arab Emirates. Despite the ban on trade since the 1970s, poaching level of rhino horns has risen over the last decade, leading the rhino population into crisis.

Poaching has many causes in both Africa and China. The issue of poaching is not a simple one to solve as traditional methods to counter poaching have not taken into the account the poverty levels that drive some poachers and the lucrative profits made by organized crime syndicates who deal in illegal wildlife trafficking. Conservationists hope the new emerging multi-lateral approach, which would include the public, conservation groups, and the police, will be successful for the future of these animals.

=== United States ===
Some game wardens have made use of robotic decoy animals placed in high visibility areas to draw out poachers for arrest after the decoys are shot. Decoys with robotics to mimic natural movements are also in use by law enforcement. The Marine Monitor radar system watches sensitive marine areas for illicit vessel movement.

== See also ==
- African vulture trade
- Anti-poaching
- Cruelty to animals
- Environmental crime
- Federal and state environmental relations
- Game law
- Game preservation
- Illegal, unreported and unregulated fishing
- Ivory trade
- Rhino poaching in Southern Africa
- Species affected by poaching
- Tiger poaching in India
- Wildlife trade
