= One Wing (eagle) =

Bald eagle injured in the Exxon Valdez oil spill

- Species: Bald eagle
- Sex: male
- Hatched: c.1979
- Died: 2008
- Cause of death: Heart tumour
- Known for: Surviving the Exxon Valdez oil spill

One Wing was a bald eagle injured during the Exxon Valdez oil spill. He ingested crude oil and, during the rescue process, fought his would-be-rescuers and broke his own wing. As a result, it was amputated, and he lived out the rest of his life at the Bird Treatment and Learning Center in Anchorage. He served as a blood donor for other birds injured in the oil spill.

== Life ==
One Wing, then an approximately ten year old bald eagle, was injured as a result of the 1989 Exxon Valdez oil spill and found by humans. Poisoned by crude oil, which was likely ingested as a result of eating contaminated prey, One Wing fought his rescuers and broke his wing. He and twenty three other bald eagles were sent to Bird TLC, a wildlife rehabilitation center in Anchorage, Alaska. The volunteers there amputated his left wing but, due to the extent of his injuries, did not expect him to survive. They made the decision to use him as a blood donor and drew blood from him from a daily basis. The center estimated that he had donated blood to "hundreds" of other birds during this time.

Despite his poor prognosis, One Wing recovered. He was given a mew in Fort Richardson, which he shared with Old Witch, one of the other bald eagles injured during the oil spill. According to James R. Scott, the founder of Bird TLC and the veterinarian who rescued One Wing, the eagle had a staunchly independent disposition, refused to have his beak or claws tended to, and rarely let Scott touch him. In the early 2000s, a boy scout built Old Witch and One Wing a new mew. One Wing and Old Witch laid eggs together, but they did not hatch. Old Witch died in 2007.

In May 2008, One Wing died of a ruptured heart tumor. Bird TLC sought permission from the United States Fish and Wildlife Service to have him cremated, and announced their intentions to scatter his ashes in Prince William Sound. To commemorate the occasion, a local drum group was given permission to play an Eyak honor song.

== One Wing's Gift ==
One Wing and his fellow birds at Bird TLC were featured in a children's book written and illustrated by Joan Harris. Harris had originally begun studying to birds at the center in order to complete a set of scientific illustrations. Published in 2002, One Wing's Gift: Rescuing Alaska's Wild Birds contains the story of One Wing and other birds from the center, and ends with nine of them being released back into the wild.

== See also ==
- Lady Baltimore (eagle), an eagle in Juneau, Alaska
- List of individual birds
