= Nyamu =

Nyamu is a surname of African origin. Notable people with the surname include:

- Jesaya Nyamu (born 1942), Namibian politician
- Jim Nyamu, Kenyan scientist and activist
- Julius Nyamu (born 1977), Kenyan runner
- Karen Nyamu, Kenyan politician
