= Alaska Raptor Center =

Raptor rehabilitation center in Alaska, US

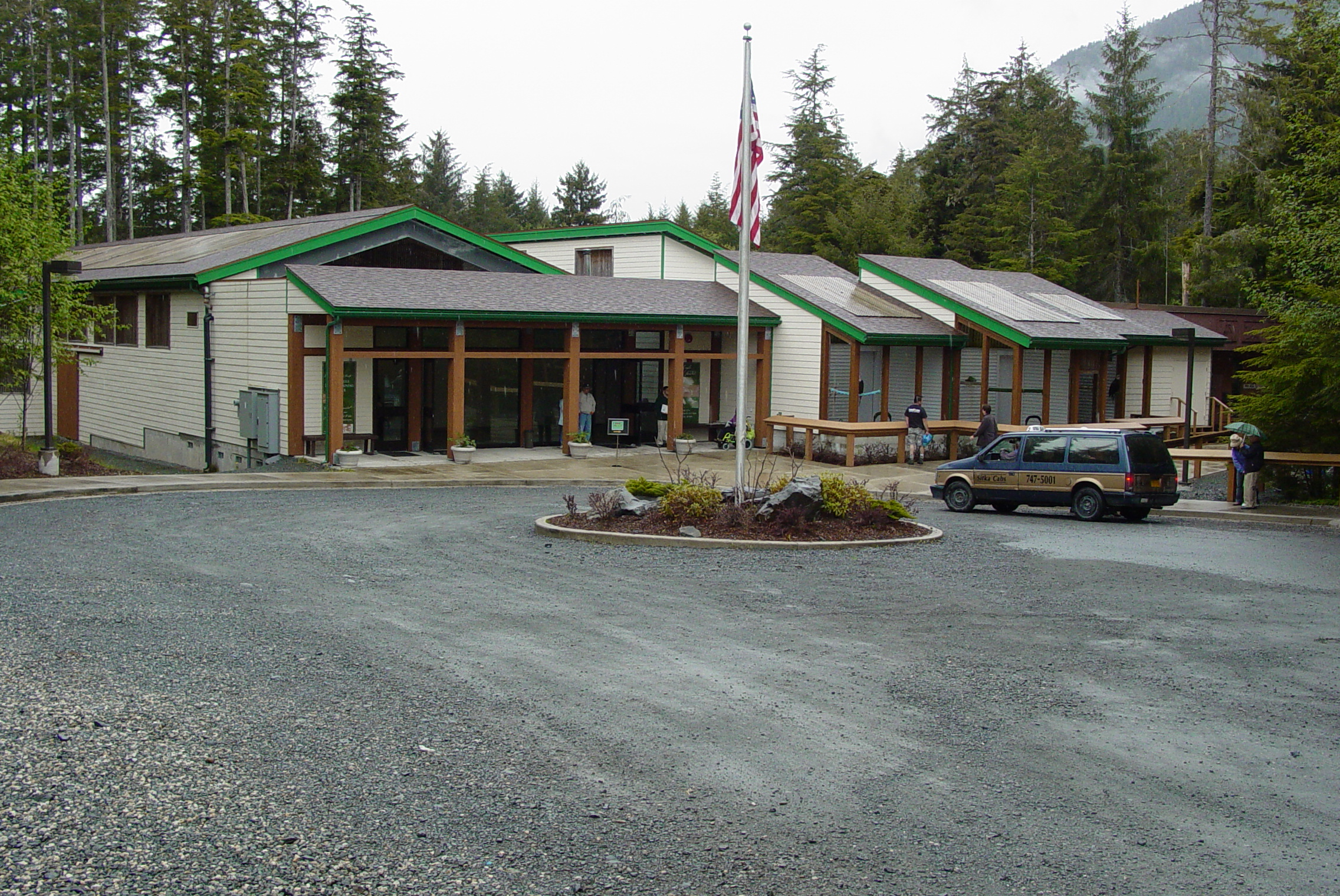
- Interactive map of Alaska Raptor Center
- Type: Raptor rehabilitation center
- Location: 1000 Raptor Way; Sitka, Alaska
- Coordinates: 57°03′09″N 135°18′58″W
- Area: 17 acres (6.9 ha)
- Created: 1980
- Operator: Carol Bryant-Martin (director)
- Visitors: 100,000+
- Other information: Exhibit: Eagle rehabilitation center
- Website: alaskaraptor.org

The Alaska Raptor Center, formerly the Alaska Raptor Rehabilitation Center, is a private nonprofit raptor rehabilitation center in Sitka in the U.S. state of Alaska. Located on a 17–acre campus bordering the Tongass National Forest and the Indian River. The center in Sitka is open to the public and offers daily tours.

== Rehabilitation ==
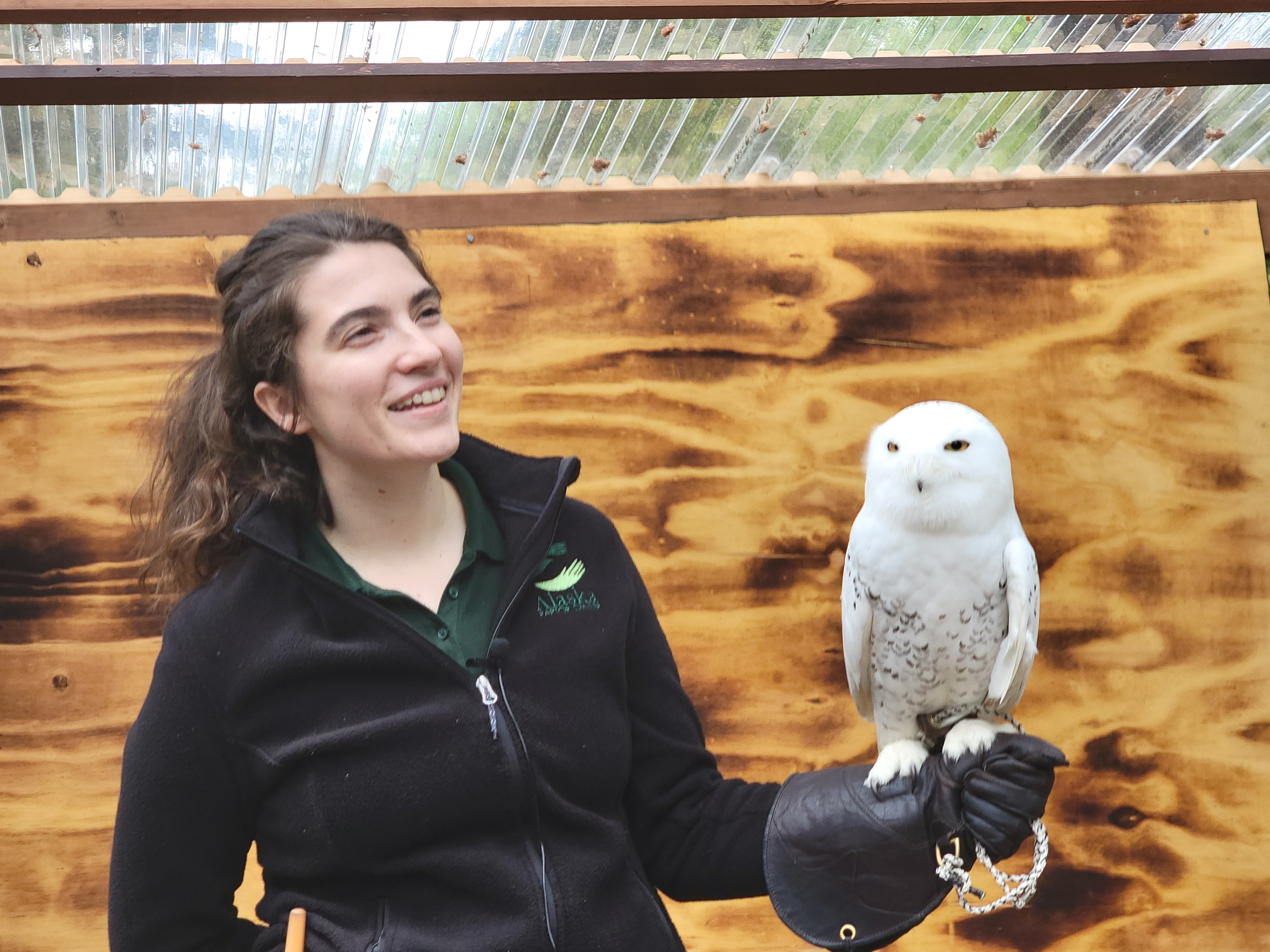
A snowy owl (Bubo scandiacus) that was rehabilitated.

The mission of the Alaska Raptor Center is to promote and enhance wild populations of raptors and other avian species through rehabilitation, education and research. Although the main patients are raptors, especially bald eagles, the center will take any bird in need of care.

The Alaska Raptor Center receives between 100–200 birds a year, with many suffering from some sort of trauma. They have treated birds with injuries from electrocution, collisions, gunshot wounds, leg hold traps, starvation, disease and lead poisoning.

Many of their patients come from outside of Sitka and are flown in via Alaska Airlines or smaller regional airlines. The birds travel in dog kennels that have been covered to block out light. This helps to keep the birds calm when traveling. When an eagle is healthy enough, they will be moved into the Suzanne and Walter Scott Foundation Bald Eagle Flight Training Center. This is a large indoor area where they are able to fly, bathe and interact with other eagles until it is time for them to be released. Birds that are no longer able to live outside of human care are placed in zoos or wildlife centers throughout the United States to serve as ambassadors for their species.

Some of the birds that sustained injuries that did not allow them to be released have found a permanent home at the Alaska Raptor Center. More than 100,000 visitors annually come to see the two dozen resident eagles, hawks, owls, falcons and ravens, who assist in the center's secondary function, public education. The most well-known resident was Volta, a bald eagle who suffered permanent shoulder damage after a 1992 collision with power lines. Volta retired from doing on-glove education programs in 2020 and lived in the Bald Eagle Habitat off the back deck of the Raptor Center. In January 2024, Volta was humanly euthanized due to failing health and a reduced quality of life. He was at least 37 years old in 2024, possibly older.

== Gallery ==
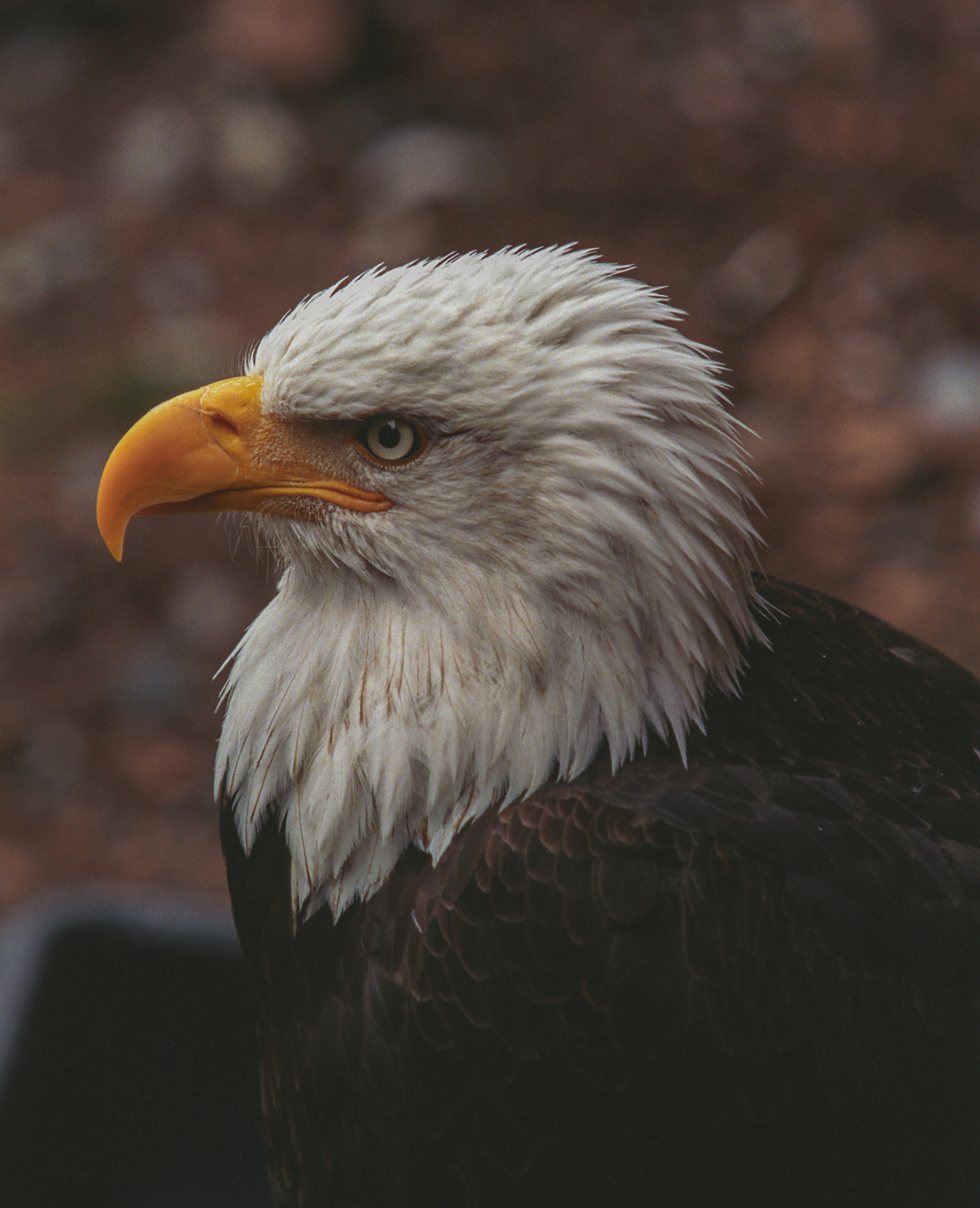
Volta, a bald eagle

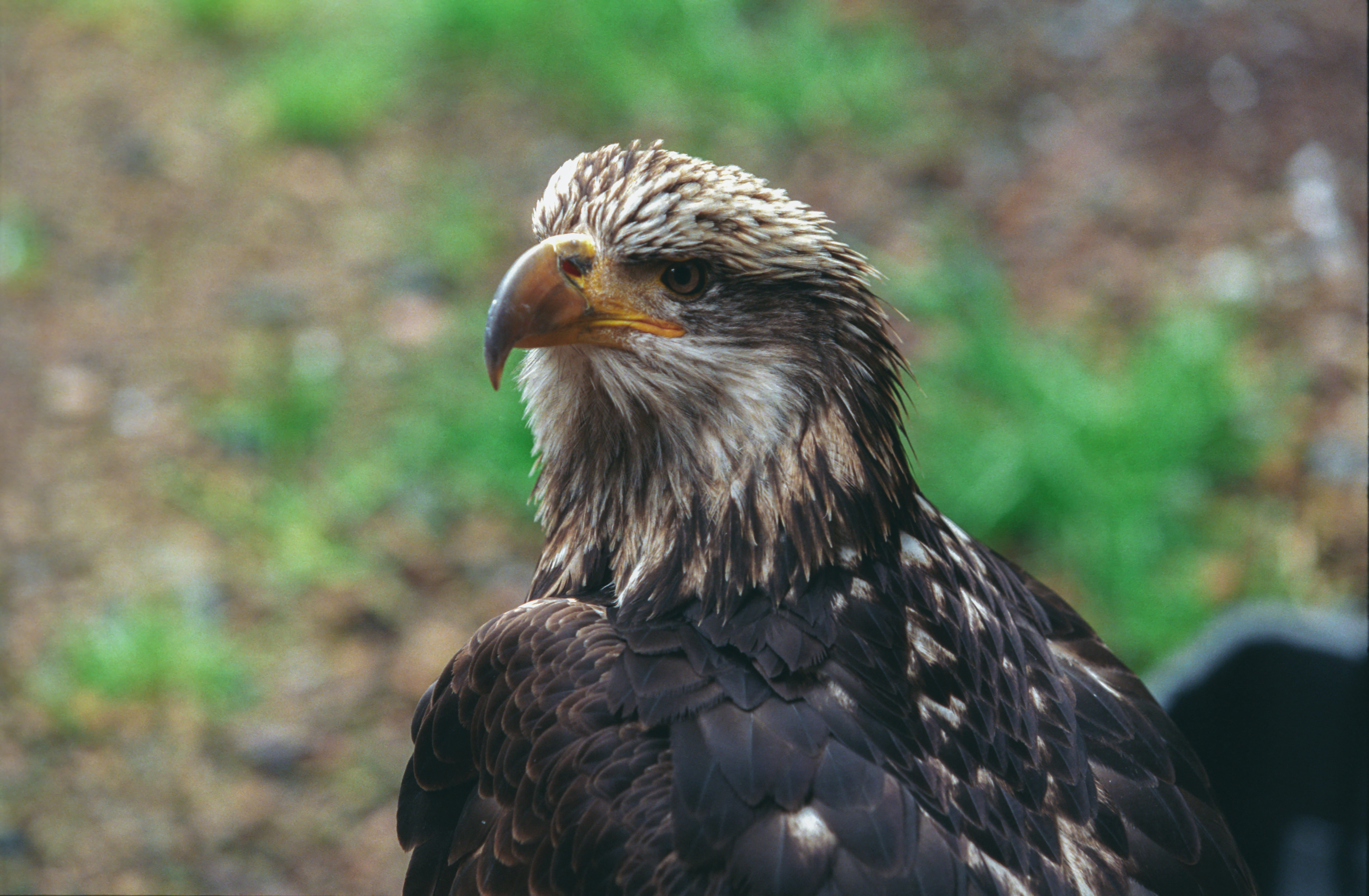
A juvenile bald eagle

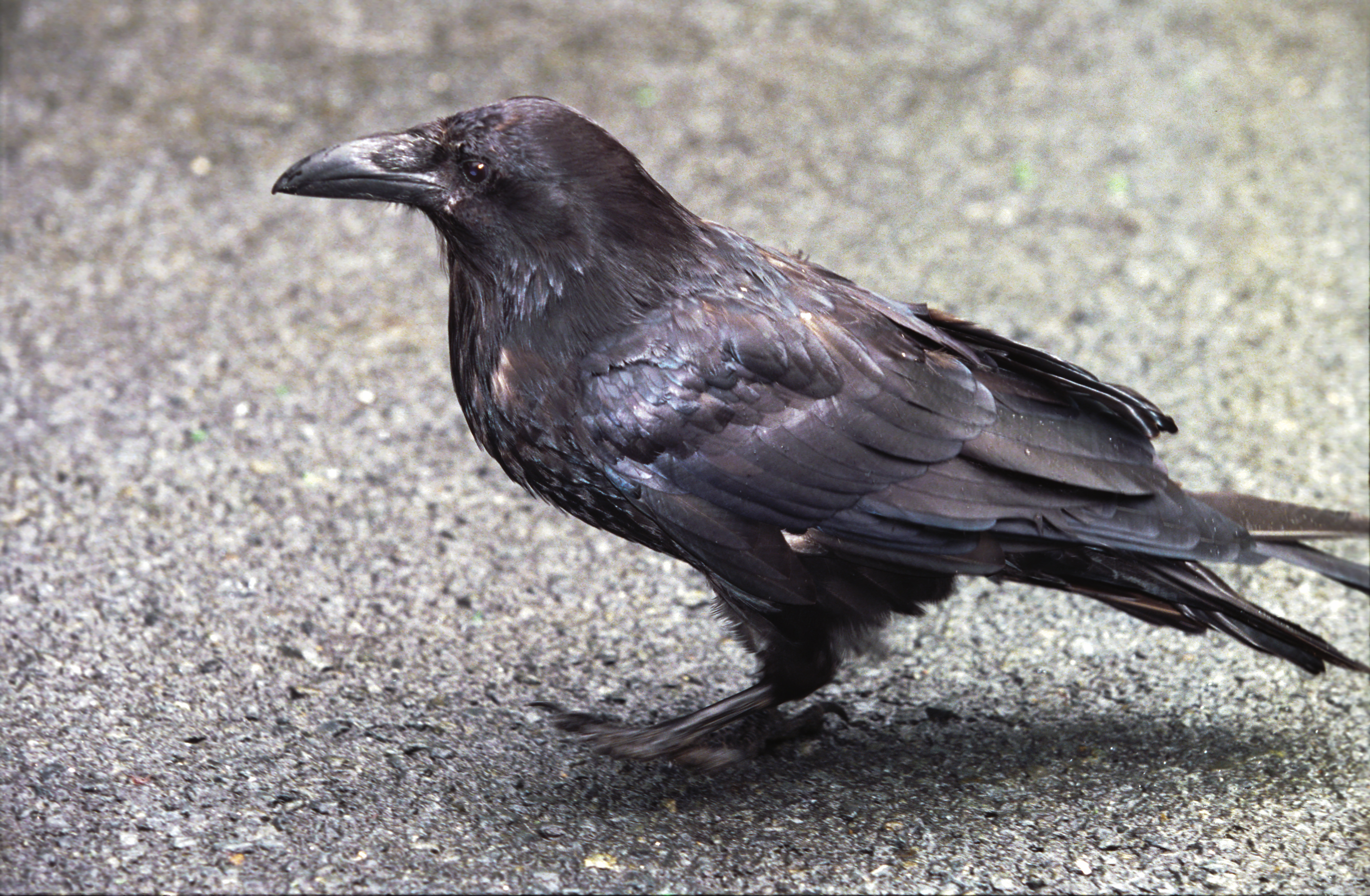
Gilbert, a raven

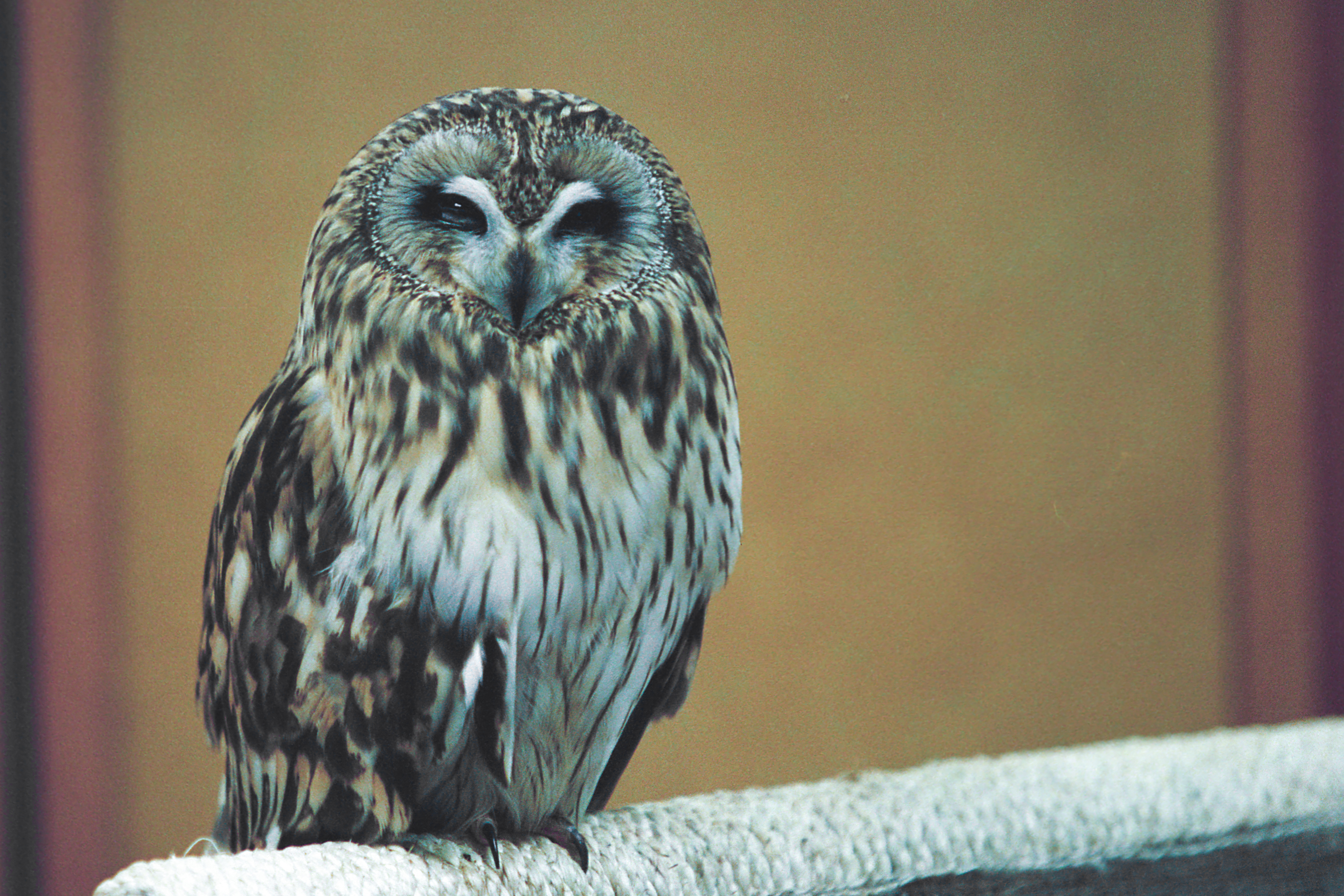
Asio, a short-eared owl

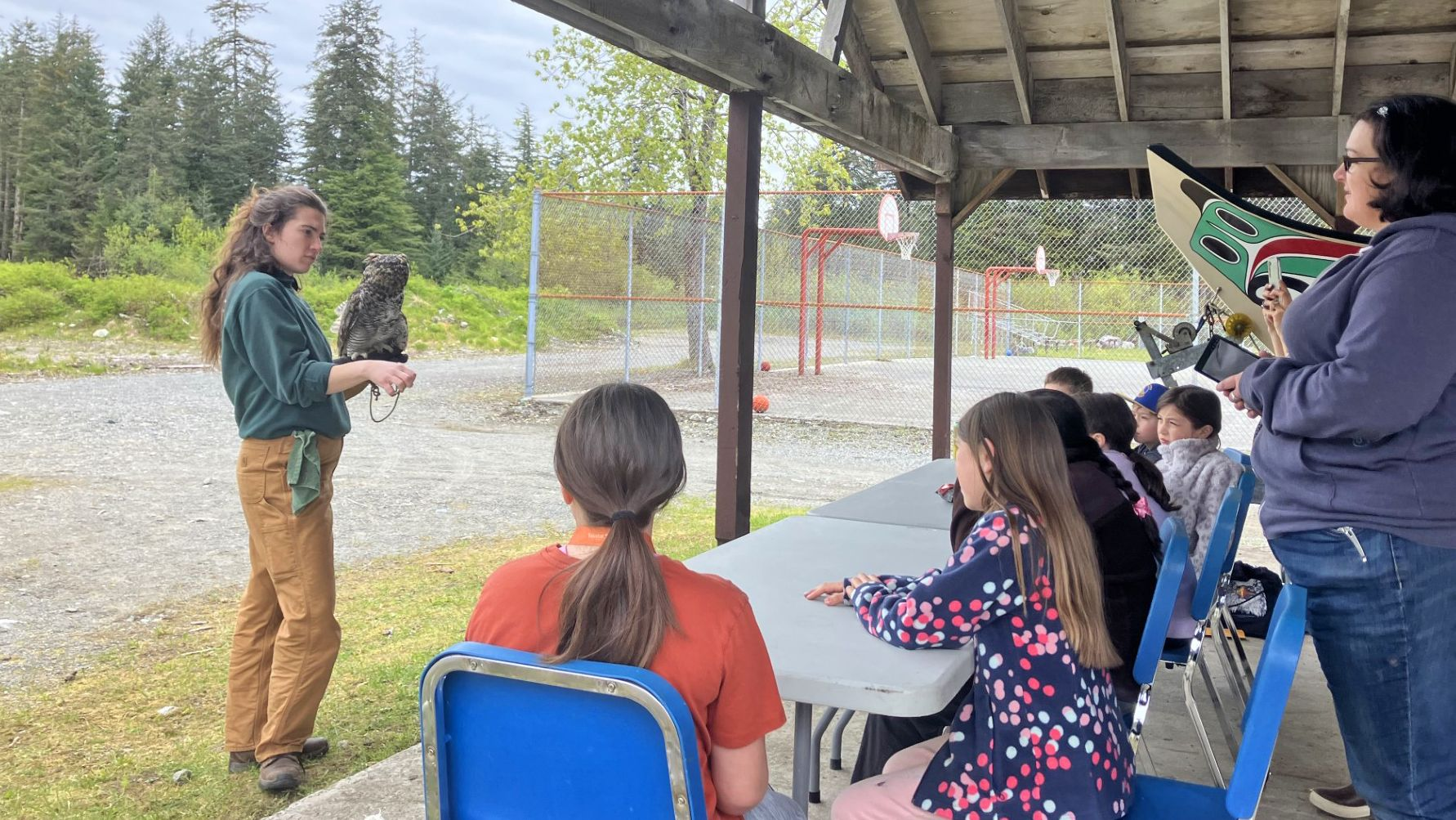
Outreach event by a staff member of the center.

== See also ==
- Juneau Raptor Center
- Bird Treatment and Learning Center
