= Anchorage White Raven =

Popular leucistic raven from Alaska

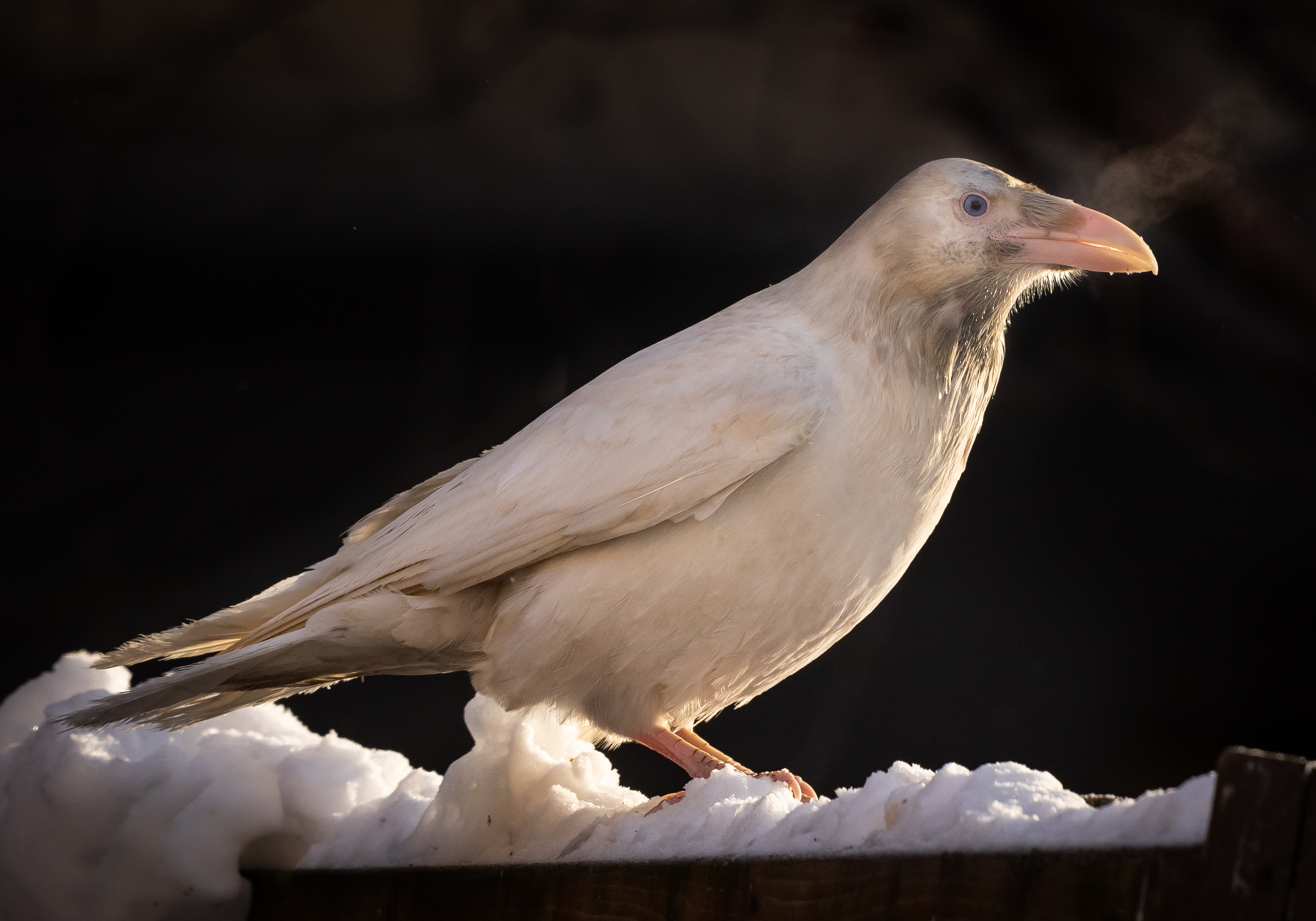
- The Anchorage White Raven in March 2024
- Species: Common raven
- Sex: unknown
- Hatched: 2023; Kenai Peninsula
- Known for: Leucistic appearance

The Anchorage White Raven is a leucistic common raven (Corvus corax) that resided in Anchorage, Alaska, from 2023 to 2024. Hatched on the Kenai Peninsula in the spring of 2023, the raven moved to Anchorage by October 2023. Over 27,000 people joined a Facebook group dedicated to tracking the raven, during which time it had gained a reputation as a trickster. The raven left Anchorage in April 2024 and was last sighted in Soldotna. The raven's status and whereabouts are unknown as of December 2024.

== Description ==
The Anchorage White Raven is a common raven (Corvus corax) of unknown sex. It is white with blue eyes, making it leucistic. Birds with the leucistic phenotype are rare, with a 1 in 30,000 chance of being hatched. Due to the bird's condition, concerns were expressed that it would have a hard time surviving the winter.

It hatched on the Kenai Peninsula in the spring of 2023, one of seven siblings still under the care of their mother in June. One of its siblings had white feathers on its chest and another had reddish feathers on its head. Despite fears that its appearance would cause it to be rejected by other members of the species, this did not prove to be the case. The bird was seen in the company of other ravens and was an "alpha". It was pictured with a black raven in a series of photos, sparking rumors that the raven had entered a romantic relationship. Due to the bird's age, they were more likely siblings.

The bird gained a reputation as a trickster. It successfully fought other ravens over a container of White Raspberry Chocolate Truffle–flavored Häagen-Dazs ice cream, and stole a bolt from a street lamp. Like other Anchorage ravens it foraged for food in dumpsters and was known to eat toast, tater tots, and pizza.

== History ==
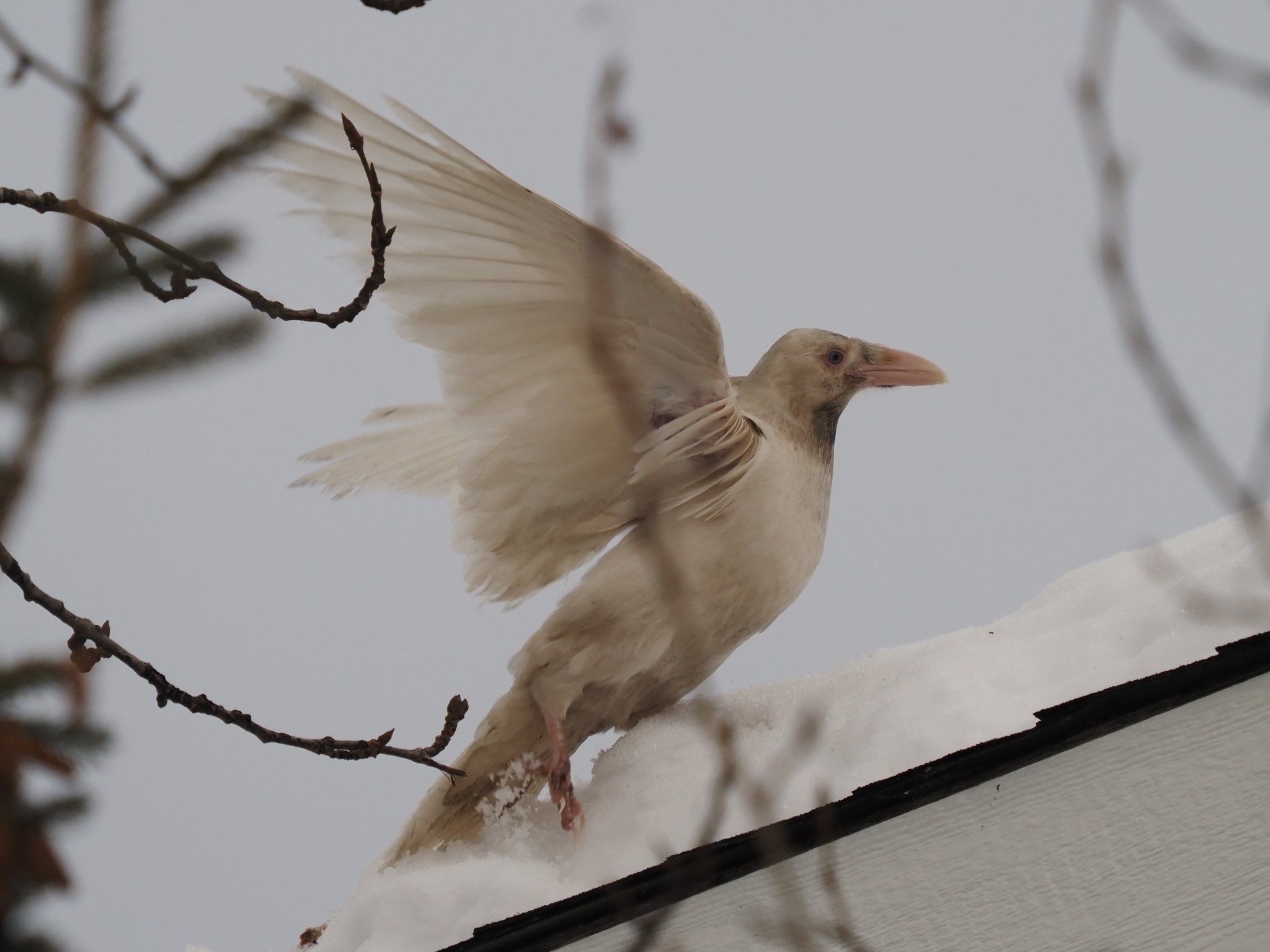
The Anchorage White Raven in November 2023

In the summer of 2023, a white raven was spotted by locals on the Kenai Peninsula. Local photographers and members of the community, intrigued by the bird's distinctive appearance, began posting pictures of it to social media. By October 2023, it had moved to Anchorage, Alaska. It was first spotted at the Alaska Native Heritage Center but became known to frequent the neighborhood of Spenard. Whether the bird in Anchorage is the same as the one spotted in Homer has been disputed; due to the rarity of the leucism (the last leucistic raven known to live in the area was spotted during the 1990s), biologists such as Rick Sinnott believe it is the same bird.

A Facebook group, called Anchorage White Raven Spottings, was set up for locals to share raven sightings and pictures. Over 27,000 people joined the group. People followed the raven as it went around town, with some people traveling from Canada and the rest of the United States. One person, a retired police detective, took more than 10,000 photos of the raven. People also made white raven–inspired artwork, such as mouse pads and earrings.

Some individuals made connections between the bird and Native Alaskan religions, in many of which a trickster Raven plays an important part. For example, a Yup'ik prophecy recorded by Rita Pitka Blumenstein is said to predict the arrival of a white raven "when the world becomes more spiritual again".

The last documented sighting of the raven occurred in April 2024. It was seen in Anchorage on April 20, and Soldotna on April 21. Despite hopes that the raven would return to Anchorage around October to early November 2024, no sightings were reported. This left the status of the raven as unknown.

== Legacy ==
The 2025 Fur Rendezvous Festival pin, depicting a white raven with blue eyes sitting next to a regular black raven, was inspired by the Anchorage White Raven. The Bird Treatment and Learning Center announced that it would hold a fundraiser inspired by the bird. Local people donated their White Raven photographs for the center's auction, and others announced they would give talks about their experiences tracking the raven.

== See also ==
- List of individual birds
