= Federal and state environmental relations =

There are benefits to leaving environmental regulation both to the federal government to the states. For example, wildlife conservation is much more of a concern for Alaska than for New York. New York, however, has much bigger air and light pollution issues than Alaska.

Because of all of these factors, it almost never ends up being an either/or situation in terms of environmental regulation. One of the few areas that is under complete federal control is the storage and disposal of commercial-level nuclear waste, most likely because the consequences of not properly dealing with it are more dire than for most environmental concerns. States have greater regulatory freedom for areas like air and water pollution, presumably because they are not considered to be as high-stakes as nuclear waste.

== Major environmental legislation affecting federal and state relationships ==
Federal air regulation	Federal water regulation	Federal solid waste regulation	Other federal environmental regulation
Clean Air Act (CAA)	Clean Water Act (CWA)	Resource Conservation and Recovery Act (RCRA)	Federal Insecticide, Fungicide, and Rodenticide Act (FIFRA)
Corporate Average Fuel Economy (CAFE)	Coastal Zone Management Act (CZMA)	Comprehensive Environmental Response, Compensation, and Liability Act (CERCLA)	Emergency Planning and Community Right-to-Know Act
	Safe Drinking Water Act (SDWA)		Endangered Species Act

== Formation of policy ==
Prior to the late 1970s, nearly all environmental policy was at the state and local level. Federal environmental regulation addressed the federal government itself, rather than states, consumers, or industry. This all changed with a flurry of environmental legislation in the early 1970s. Currently, most federal environmental laws grant both expansive regulatory authority to federal agencies, as well as authorize states to implement plans outlined in federal laws. This model is often called "cooperative federalism".

=== States shaping federal policy ===
Relationships between state and federal parties often shape environmental laws and policy. States can directly shape federal policy in the way states choose to enforce, or not enforce, environmental regulation. Federal regulation of nonpoint source water pollution is often cited as weak, in part because localities often lack the incentive to enforce federal regulations, and federal enforcers do not have the authority to countermand state decisions. In areas where the federal government cannot directly intervene, state and local governments have a very strong hand in shaping the practical effect of federal regulation.

States often serve as testing grounds for policies which may be adopted as federal law or policy later. This idea, often called "laboratories of democracy", was articulated by Louis Brandeis in dissent to a 1932 supreme court ruling. If states are left a free hand to try different forms of regulation, the relative merits of each approach will be easier to identify. States often adopt successful regulations from other states as well. One example is treatment of electronic waste. Currently, 18 states and New York City have enacted laws requiring the recycling of electronics at the end of their useful lives., whereas the Federal programs do not treat electronic waste different from other solid waste. Some states have adopted legislation similar to existing legislation in other states, and Congress has recently considered several bills to regulate e-waste, perhaps as a result of pioneering state regulation.

States have also used litigation to force federal regulation. A "deluge" of litigation has forced federal agencies, and the EPA in particular, to adopt more aggressive policies. Nowhere is this trend more clear than with greenhouse gas emissions. In the absence of federal climate change regulation, states have brought public nuisance suits against carbon emitters and the EPA. In Massachusetts v. EPA, a group of states succeeded in compelling EPA to promulgate rules to regulate CO_{2} emissions under the clean air act States have spurred federal action by bringing suit against emitters directly, such as when California sued General Motors and a number of states sued power companies, both over carbon emissions.

=== Federal policy shaping state policy ===
Federal regulation often acts as a signal to states. States may perceive this signal to mean more stringent regulation is necessary. Alternately, states may understand federal regulation to be a maximum standard or states may believe federal legislation crowds out state action. In some cases, states have reacted to federal environmental policy by enacting legislation to limit state agencies from enforcing standards more stringent than federal standards. States may also adopt radically different policies as a result of perceived weakness in federal legislation.

Lastly, limits on state and federal power have often shaped environmental regulation. Federal law may preempt state legislation in issues of interstate commerce or navigable waters. Federalism doctrine limits federal power as well. For example, federal policy regarding non-point water pollution is typically subsidies to states with plans to regulate these emissions, in part because of the serious question as to whether the federal government can regulate interstate land use, as it applies to pollution.

== Federalism ==
=== Overview ===
Since environmental issues are so complex, it is often lawmakers' opinion that the regulations covering these issues should be broad, all-encompassing and adjustable as new information is made available. Environmental issues are often regional or nationwide and this is reflected in regulation. Some problems are addressed at the federal level or the state level, while others are regulated by both.

Under the 10th amendment, any area over which the federal government does not have authority is under state authority. Federal regulation preempts state and local legislation under the supremacy clause when the two conflict, and under the Dormant Commerce Clause when federal legislation is silent and states seek local protectionism. In many situations of environmental regulations, state and federal governments have Concurrent powers, where each government is permitted to have its own regulation.

When the federal government would like state governments to take certain actions, the federal government may use conditional spending provisions, offering money if states take the desired actions. While some link must exist between the federal money and the desired action, the links may be tenuous. The federal government may not coerce state action or commandeer state resources to take certain actions. However, when the federal government has authority to take the desired actions directly, it may use conditional preemption. Conditional preemption is where the federal government allows states to take the desired actions, and if states do not satisfy federal demands, the federal government steps in and takes over enforcement. Both the Clean Air Act and the Clean Water Act contain conditional spending provisions.

=== Examples ===
- With the Coastal Zone Management Act, the federal government sought to encourage states to develop a plan for managing coastal zones. The act is voluntary and the federal government assists with the creation of plans and with finances. State management plans have authority and any federal actions in the states is limited to state plans. The Emergency Planning and Community Right-to-Know Act is another example of inducement. The federal government wanted states and tribes to have a plan in the event of a chemical disaster. They offered funding for states and tribes to create such a plan, as well as offered technical expertise and information.

- The Endangered Species Program is one example of concurrent powers. The federal program maintains a list of endangered or threatened animals that must be protected. States, such as Florida, may have their own plans designating animals as threatened or endangered. Federal law serves as a floor, establishing the minimum a state may do to protect species on these lists, and the minimum number of animals on these lists.

- The Clean Air Act provides an example of conditional preemption. States regulators make the permitting decisions with regard to new sources of pollution. The EPA, however, may countermand state permitting decisions under some circumstances.

== Enforcement ==
=== Federal involvement ===
Many environmental laws establish federal standards as the minimum criteria needed to be met in order to ensure state compliance. These include the SDWA, RCRA, CAA, and CWA. The notion is that as long as states meet the federal standards, the EPA will not step in. However, there are fundamental differences regarding how this is enforced.

State notification and assistance are used by the EPA to encourage state and local governments to initiate environmental action.

- In the CAA, the EPA must issue a notice to the state government, informing the state that there is an instance of non-compliance that must be corrected. If the state does not take corrective measures by the declared deadline in the notice, the EPA can assume all enforcement authority previously given to the state regarding the CAA. The deadline cannot be any later than 1 year from the date the notice was issued.
- FIFRA gives the EPA strict authority on designating which chemicals must be registered and therefore regulated. Much like the CAA, states in non-compliance are given a notification; however, in this case it is a 90-day notice.
- The SWDA requires the EPA to maintain an up-to-date list of states that are potentially non-compliant with the federal standards. If continued infractions warrant federal intervention, the EPA must provide technical assistance, advice, and a 60-day notification to the state, so the state has a chance for remedial action.

In some cases the EPA has the authority to issue permits to polluters.

- The CWA gives the EPA such authority. However, this issuing right can be given to states that meet federal standards. Unlike the CAA and the FIFRA, the Federal government retains enforcement authority even if issuing rights are delineated and no EPA notification of intervention is required.

The EPA can implement environmental compliance with command and control policy instruments.

- When a pollutant presents an imminent danger to the populace under RCRA and SWDA, the EPA can take complete control of state enforcement authority without any notice.
- Under RCRA, the EPA can not only obtain all state enforcement authority for solid waste control, but they can also force the state to create its own entity to control and monitor solid waste pollution. Although notification to the state by the EPA is required by law, the timeline of the notification is not strictly defined, allowing the EPA to interpret what is considered a "timely manner for notification". Furthermore, the EPA has created "guidelines", called the Enforcement Response Policy, that establish specific techniques to solve pollution problems and sources of pollution that should be dealt with. Although states are not legally required to abide by these "guidelines", the EPA uses them as a measurement of compliance. Therefore, states must adhere to these "guidelines" in order to prevent federal intervention; however, these guidelines are very specific in some cases such that states with limited resources cannot properly address other sources or use more efficient techniques that are not covered in the "guidelines".
- CERCLA grants the EPA the authority to put contaminated Superfund sites on the National Priorities List. This list designates sites that must be cleaned up to protect public health. The EPA has the option to lead the cleanup themselves and require state involvement or give funds to a state, who would then lead the cleanup measures. However, before the EPA can provided any funding to a state, the state must guarantee that it will meet certain EPA requirements in the cleanup effort.

=== State reliance ===
When the EPA is not responsible for funding or lacks funds, state and local governments are given more enforcement authority by default.

- The Emergency Planning and Community Right to Know Act grants federal authority to state and local governments in order to gather information about potentially hazardous chemicals stored within the local communities. Congress did not provide the EPA with much funding for this Act, allowing for state and local initiatives to expand without federal oversight.

Federal powers are limited when states enter agreements with the EPA or act as the EPA's agent.

- Regulation involving underground storage tanks under RCRA encourage state level enforcement. RCRA does not mandate states to adopt an underground storage tank program of their own if the EPA deems the state capable of enforcing compliance and the state enters into an agreement with the EPA. In these circumstances, the state is acting as an agent of the federal government. Thus, actions administered by the state may preclude any further action by the federal government.

=== Cooperation ===
Federal and state governments also coordinate litigation with each other, fostering more effective environmental enforcement. This is especially the case when dealing with multi-state issues and overlapping jurisdictions.

- Many regional EPA offices and state environmental entities regularly hold conferences together to ensure that important information and details are shared for quicker action.
- Federal, state, and local entities may even voluntarily join environmental action groups to create better environmental regulations.

=== Federal and state overlap ===
- Overfiling occurs when entities who do not meet either state and federal pollution standards are penalized by the state and then again penalized by the federal government. This creates complications for the entity being punished, as well as the state and federal governments themselves. If overfiling occurs, entities will be less willing to enter agreements with a state, fearing that what the state promises may be superseded by the will of the federal government. Subsequently, the state government may be less cooperative in future dealings with the federal government. An example of this is the case of U.S. v. Power Engineering Co., No. 01-1217 (Sept. 4, 2002) under RCRA.

- In some cases, states will file their own legislation separate from the federal government for additional environmental regulation This is the case for New Jersey's Industrial Site Recovery Act (ISRA) to CERCLA. In Alaska Dept. of Environmental Conservation v. EPA, the Supreme Court found that both the EPA and states have some authority in state permitting decisions, and under certain circumstances, the EPA may countermand state permitting decisions.

- In an 1824 Supreme Court case Gibbons v. Ogden (22 U.S. 1), control over navigable waterways was held to be included within the commerce clause. This granted the federal government direct regulatory authority over the waterways themselves, and forms the basis of the Clean Water Act and wetlands policy.

- In 2014, Florida state passed a housing bill that will interfere with federal oversight of waterways and wetlands.
- Economic studies show that whether the federal government uses a price instrument (like a pollution tax to regulate emissions or a feed-in-tariff to support renewable energy) or a quantity instrument (like an emission trading scheme or auctions of renewable energy capacities) fundamentally changes the incentives for state governments to enforce their own regulation on the issue.

=== See also ===
- Game law
- Illegal wildlife trade
- Poaching
