= Jim Nyamu =

Kenyan elephant research scientist and activist

Jim Justus Nyamu, of Nairobi, Kenya, is an elephant research scientist and activist against poaching and trade in ivory. Nyamu is the executive director at the Elephant Neighbors Center (ENC) and is leader of the movement, Ivory Belongs to Elephants. He has also held positions at the African Conservation Centre and Kenya Wildlife Service. The ENC is a grass-roots collaborative and participatory research organization focused on enhancing the capacity of communities living with wildlife to promote interlinkages between species and their habitats.

== Walks ==
Nyamu walks in support of elephants, and has garnered local, national, and international media coverage.

In September and October 2013, he walked 560 miles—from Boston, MA, to Washington, DC—culminating on 4 October in the Washington, DC, portion of an International March for Elephants, a worldwide event organized by the David Sheldrick Wildlife Trust (DSWT). The DSWT sponsored marches in 15 cities, ranging from London to Cape Town to Bangkok. Independently, sympathetic groups marched in about 25 other cities around the world.

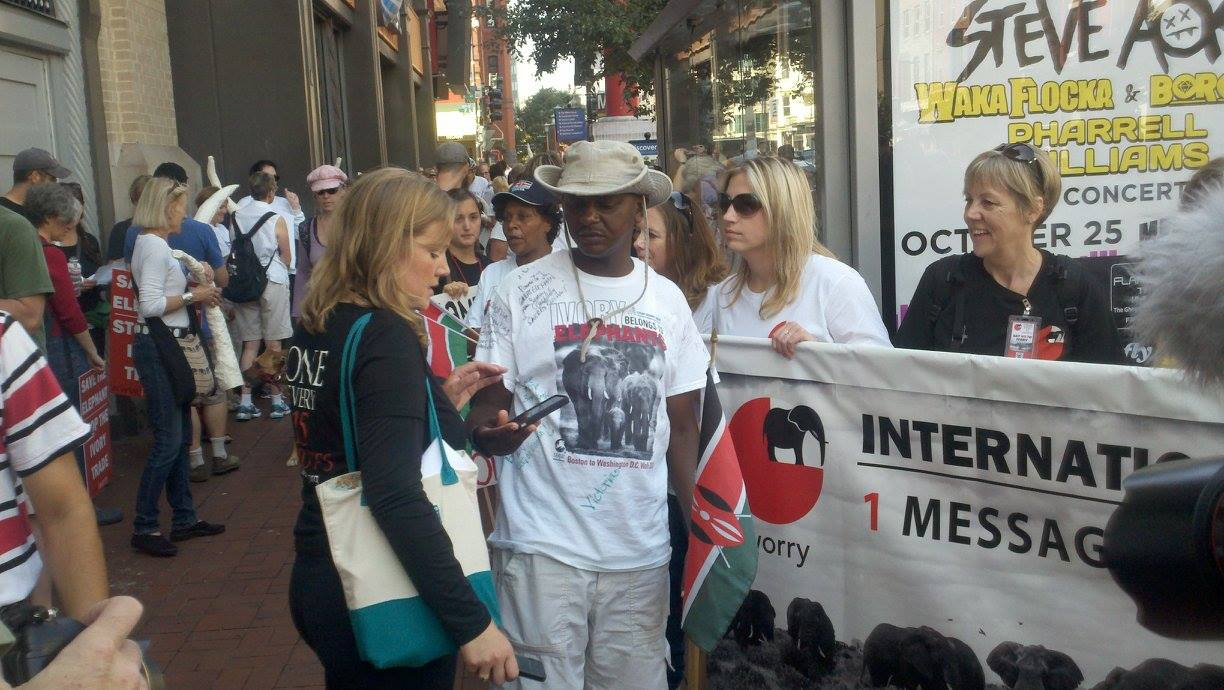
Jim Nyamu (center) was a featured speaker at the Washington, DC, International March for Elephants, held in many cities around the world. He had just finished a 560-mile walk from Boston, MA, which took him a month.

In February 2013, Nyamu walked from Mombasa to Nairobi (311 miles) and, during the months of May and June 2013, he walked from Maasai Mara to Nairobi (1,063 miles). After his U.S. trek, he planned to head back to Africa to walk another 1,550 miles, from Uganda to Tanzania, ending up in Amboseli, Kenya. One report indicates that he plans to walk another 5,000 kilometers (3,107 miles). He is quoted as saying "I will only stop when the world appreciates the fact that ivory belongs to elephants."

Nyamu attended the ivory crush, mandated by the Obama administration, on 14 November 2013 where 6 tons of ivory were destroyed in Denver, Colorado. As part of the 2015 Global March for Elephants and Rhinos, held around the world 3 and 4 October, 11-year-old Maddie Jabs organized a walk in her hometown of Saugerties, NY. Jabs was inspired by meeting Nyamu during his 2013 walk from Boston, MA, to Washington, DC; she reportedly met up with Nyamu in New York City and walked three miles with him. According to a 30 October 2015, post in the website Coastweek.com, Nyamu and Kenya's "anti-poaching protest team" completed a 260-km (162 miles) walk, which took 11 days and covered major towns around the Maasai Mara Game Reserve in southwest Kenya. Nyamu's walks were described in Modern Africa Guy 3 April 2016. The article described Nyamu's many conversations along his walks, the dangers he faces from those involved in the ivory trade, and current price ranges for ivory, which continue to drive the trade and endanger elephants.

== East Africa Campaign Walk of 2016 ==
=== Launch with Kenyan First Lady ===
In May 2016, the First Lady of Kenya, Margaret Kenyatta, hosted a meeting at the state house in Nairobi to highlight her commitment to the protection of elephants in Kenya. David Banks and Charles Lukania Oluchina of the Nature Conservancy attended, as did Nyamu representing the Elephant Neighbours Centre. The First Lady described a video in which she participated, broadcast at a world conservation conference in Beijing, China, in December 2015, about elephant protection and the importance of wildlife-human coexistence. She spoke on how "elephants are about our lives, the economy, and national security", a message emphasized by her husband, President Uhuru Kenyatta, who oversaw the recent burning of 105 tons of elephant tusks and rhino horns confiscated from poachers and merchants.

In June 2016 in Nairobi, Mrs. Kenyatta helped launch the East Africa Grass-Root Elephant Education Campaign Walk. The event, she said, is being conducted to raise awareness of the value of elephants and rhinos, to help mitigate human-elephant conflicts, and to promote anti-poaching activities. The First Lady and Environment and Natural Resources Cabinet Secretary Judi Wakhungu both commended Nyamu, citing Nyamu's team's intention to walk more than 3200 km over 135 days—from Nairobi to Dar es Salaam (Moshi, Morongoro, Bukoba), to Kampala (Queens Elizabeth National Park, Jinja), and then back to Nairobi through Busia, Kakamega, Nakuru, which will take the team through the three East African countries of Kenya, Tanzania and Uganda.

=== Presentations in Tanzania ===
Advocating a joint antipoaching effort among the East African Community nations of Tanzania, Kenya, and Uganda, Nyamu granted an interview with the Tanzania Daily News during a stop in Moshi, Tanzania, in July 2016. The article quoted Nyamu: "We need a common policy for the three countries and it should clearly state and demarcate land for farming and livestock so as to save land that is being invaded and thus affecting wildlife." Nyamu and his entourage then headed for Dar es Salaam, Tanzania.

=== Travel through Uganda ===
In mid-August, Nyamu and his entourage crossed Lake Victoria by boat and proceeded on foot to the Ugandan border post of Mutukula. The group was met by a number of Ugandan conservationists, supporters, and staff of the Uganda Wildlife Authority, according to an article at the eTN Global Travel Industry News website. The article described Nyamu's planned route in Uganda, which was expected to traverse more than 700 km over 28 days, entering home to Kenya via a border crossing at Busia.

By 9 September 2016, Nyamu had reached Uganda. Ephraim Kamuntu, the tourism minister, in a speech delivered by James Lutalo, the director of Wildlife and Antiquities, described Nyamu as an icon of elephant conservation in Africa, and congratulated Nyamu on reaching Uganda safely.

The Monitor article cited a 2014 survey, which estimated that at least 100,000 elephants were killed for their ivory between 2010 and 2012. According to the survey, even if poaching stopped now, it might take more than 90 years for forest elephants to match their 2002 population.

=== Return to Kenya ===
After walking for 105 days through Tanzania and Uganda, Nyamu and his entourage arrived in the Uganda-Kenya border town of Busia on 16 September 2016. Nyamu was met by Kenyan Gov. Sospeter Ojaamong, Kenya Wildlife Service Director General Kitili Mbathi, environment ministry senior official Julius Kandie, county commissioner Mongo Chimwaga, and Chimwaga's Ugandan counterpart Kennedy Otiti.

Ojaamong noted that Busia plans to set aside land for an animal sanctuary. Ojaamong condemned poaching and supported raising the penalties for poaching.

On 8 October 2016, Nyamu and his entourage ended their 126-day, 3200-km (1988-mi) trek at the Kenya Wildlife Service headquarters in the outskirts of Nairobi. According to a report in The Standard, which quoted Gautama Buddha, the founder of Buddhism, Nyamu was limping from blisters and hoarse from talking. On Nyamu's return, local television station K24TV produced an overview of Nyamu's walks, which is posted on YouTube. The commentary noted that, over the course of his career, Nyamu had walked 8510 km (5288 mi) for elephants.

== Ivory Belongs to Elephants Nairobi to Marsabit Walk (2017) ==
=== Kickoff in Nairobi ===
On 7 April 2017, Nyamu and an entourage departed on a planned 31-day, 617-km (383 mi) walk through northern Kenya, from Nairobi to Marsabit. At a kickoff ceremony in Nairobi, senior KWS official Julius Kimani said that community-led initiatives such as the Nyamu-led walks have transformed elephant conservation in the country, leading to a significant reduction in poaching over the past two years.

Nyamu uses his walks as an opportunity to educate the public—face to face or through the media—concerning the plight of elephants. He posts to Instagram, YouTube, and his "walking blog" as he goes. On 19 April 2017, for example, Nyamu uploaded a clip to YouTube while visiting an educational center of the William Holden Wildlife Foundation.

== East-Southern Africa Walk (2018) ==
=== Destination: Johannesburg, South Africa ===
Nyamu launched the East-Southern Africa Walk, in July 2018, at the Elephant Neighbors Centre in Nairobi. The walk would traverse Tanzania, Zambia, Zimbabwe, and Botswana—about 2600 miles (4200 km)—and finish in Johannesburg, South Africa. Attending the launch event were Vincent O'Neill, Irish ambassador to Kenya, and John Hamilton, of the UK High Commission.

Nyamu completed the East-Southern Africa Walk in November 2018. He was welcomed back to Kenya by Hamilton, of the UK High Commission, in a ceremony at Nyayo National Stadium in Nairobi. Dr. Ben Okita, co-chair of African Elephants, as well as other conservationists, friends, and journalists also attended the ceremony.

== Ivory Belongs to Elephants Walk (2019) ==
=== Destination: Eritrea and Horn of Africa ===
Nyamu and 7 fellow Kenyans are scheduled to begin a 3600-km (2240 mi) walk around the horn of Africa starting on 14 September 2019. The route extends to Eritrea through Ethiopia and is expected to take about 120 days.

== Awards ==
=== EcoWarrior 2016 ===
Nyamu was one of 14 groups and individuals to receive the EcoWarrior 2016 award from Eco Tourism Kenya. He was honored at a 14 October 2016 gala at the Radisson Blu in Nairobi. The award recognizes those who make an "outstanding contribution to ecotourism practice in Kenya."

== See also ==
- Elephant ivory
- Ivory carving
- Poaching
- Ivory trade
