= Raptor rehabilitation =

Raptor rehabilitation is a field of veterinary medicine dealing with care for sick or injured birds of prey, with the goal of returning them to the wild. Since raptors are highly specialized predatory birds, special skills, facilities, equipment, veterinary practices and husbandry methods are necessary.

Raptor rehabilitators often use falconry techniques or gain assistance from falconers to exercise the birds prior to their release, as their muscles often atrophy during their convalescence.

In the United States, a license is required to possess any bird which falls under the Migratory Bird Treaty Act of 1918 (MBTA), and so the rehabilitators are under loose scrutiny from their state wildlife management authority as well as the United States Fish and Wildlife Service.

Raptors that cannot be released back into the wild are sometimes used for education or transferred to licensed falconers. Some states require that birds that cannot be placed or released be euthanized. Most states do not allow rehabilitators to keep raptors under their rehabilitation permit for more than a few months.

No funds for raptor rehabilitation are provided by the U.S. government, though it claims ownership of all raptors protected by the MBTA.

== How raptors become injured ==
The most common ways that a raptor may become sick or injured are lead poisoning, electrocution, and collisions. Birds that have been poisoned may require treatment and rehabilitation if the amount of lead in their blood is greater than 0.4 parts per million. Raptors that have been electrocuted usually do not survive the initial electrocution, so rehabilitation is not possible. Raptors that experience collisions, with cars, windows, or barbed wire, often have broken bones that require rehabilitation.

== Rehabilitating a raptor ==
=== Using physiotherapy to rehabilitate raptors after surgery ===
Two case studies, one involving a black hawk eagle and the other a roadside hawk, have shown that physiotherapy may allow for the shortest recovery time for Raptors that have experienced collisions and required surgery. The rehabilitation process for a raptor that requires surgery begins two weeks after the surgery. The first therapies the birds should receive are contrast therapies and passive mobility therapies. Contrast therapy is applied by alternating hot and cold water packs on the affected area. The purpose of this therapy is to decrease swelling and pain in the affected area, this therapy should occur four times a week for two weeks. Passive range of motion therapy involves manually forcing movements similar to the movements the affected joint would experience in the wild. This movement helps to loosen the joints and improves the range of motion in the affected area; the bird should be stretched four times a week for four weeks. Four weeks after surgery the raptor should begin isometric resistance and stabilization exercises. The isometric resistance routine involves manually applying resistance when the bird moves the affected area, this is done to increase the strength of the affected area. As the bird gains strength, the amount of resistance should be increased, the raptor should perform these exercises until fully recovered. The first stabilization exercise that the bird should complete is to balance on a rotating perch. When the birds perch is rotated it must use the muscles and joints in the affected area to maintain its balance on the perch, this improves the birds strength and posture. When exercising the perch should be rotated clockwise, counterclockwise, left, and right. For the second stabilization exercise the raptor should be placed on an inflatable plastic cushion, with a mat on top to prevent popping. The bird will slide on top of the cushion and will be forced to use the affected area to maintain balance, increasing its strength. The raptor should perform these stabilization exercises until fully recovered.

== Release of rehabilitated raptors ==
Raptors that have undergone rehabilitation and treatment are assessed on whether they are fit to be released back into the wild depending on flight quality (i.e., flight symmetry, lack of excessive panting, and the ability to gain altitude from the ground), and their ability to catch live prey; eagles and vultures are exceptions. Except for threatened and endangered species, post-release monitoring is not common due to its costly and time-consuming nature. If monitored, it is done through telemetry tracking such as GPS and tagging of the bird.
