= Mews (falconry) =

Birdhouse for birds of prey

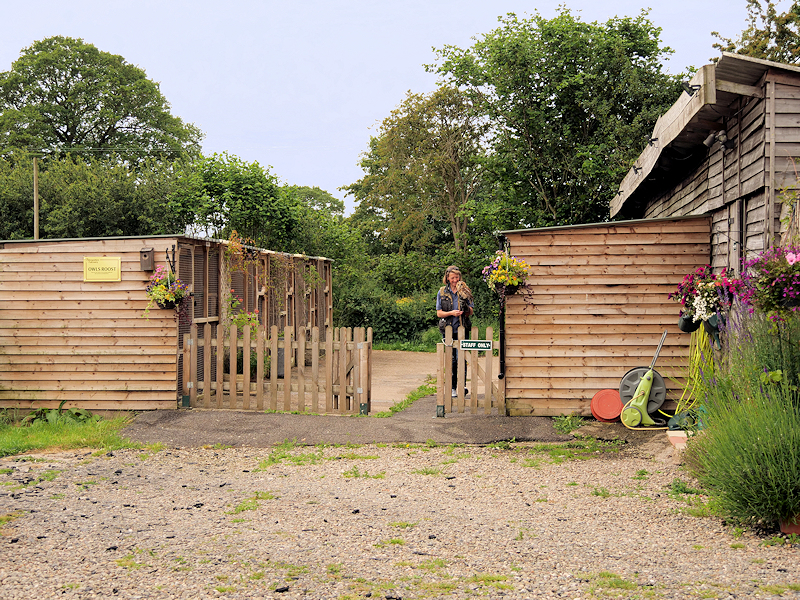
Partitioned mews for birds are located in the building in the left of this image.

In falconry, a mews is a birdhouse designed to house one or more birds of prey.

In falconry there are two types of mews: the freeloft mews and traditional mews. Traditional mews usually consist of partitioned spaces designed to keep tethered birds separated with perches for each bird in the partitioned space. Many birds can be safely and comfortably housed in this setup. Traditional mews must be accompanied by a weathering yard to allow captive raptors adequate time outside as most traditional mews do not permit tethered raptors to spend time outdoors.

Freeloft mews allow captive raptors more freedom of motion, and require much more space, as usually only one raptor may safely occupy the much larger chambers. Mews chambers can be as small as 36 square feet (3.3 m^{2}) and are frequently much larger, often occupying as much space as a small house and sometimes reaching as high as three storeys. Birds are allowed to fly free within the chamber, and very often can choose between a number of perches.

The word "mews" came from French muer = "to change", because falconry birds were put in the mews while they were moulting.
