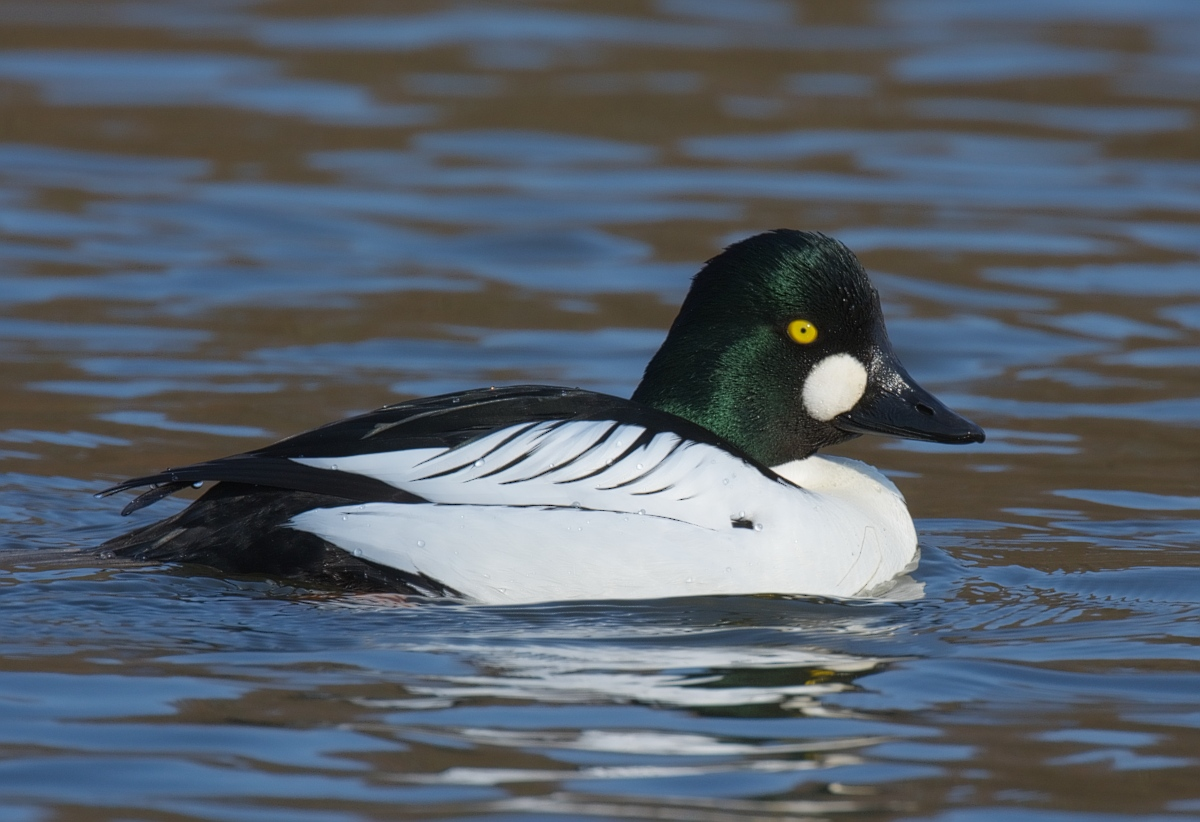
- male B. c. clangula Göteborg, Sweden
- female B. c. americana Calgary, AB, Canada

Conservation status
- Least Concern (IUCN 3.1)

Scientific classification
- Kingdom: Animalia
- Phylum: Chordata
- Class: Aves
- Order: Anseriformes
- Family: Anatidae
- Genus: Bucephala
- Species: B. clangula

Binomial name
- Bucephala clangula (Linnaeus, 1758)

Subspecies
- B. c. clangula (Linnaeus, 1758); (Eurasian goldeneye): B. c. americana (Bonaparte, 1838); (American goldeneye)
- Breeding Nonbreeding

Synonyms
- Anas bucephala Linnaeus, 1758; Anas glaucion Linnaeus, 1758; Clangula clangula (Linnaeus, 1758)

= Common goldeneye =

Species of bird

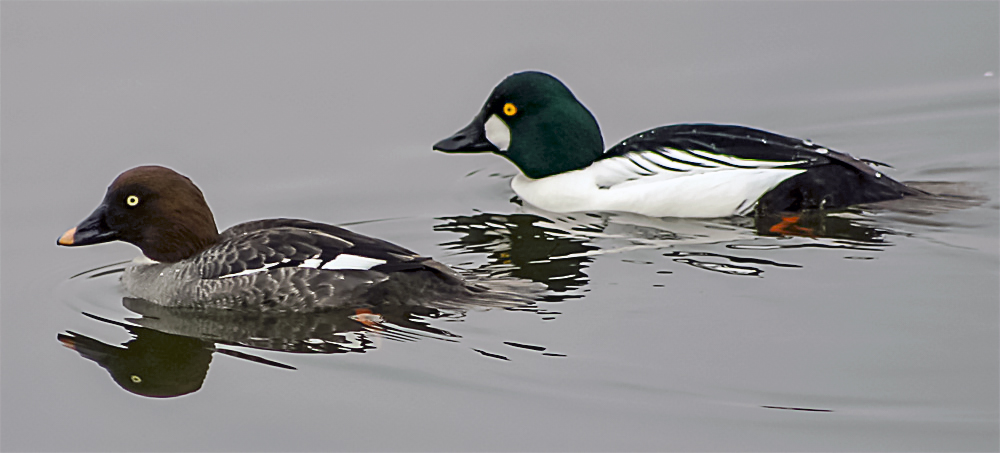
Bucephala clangula pair

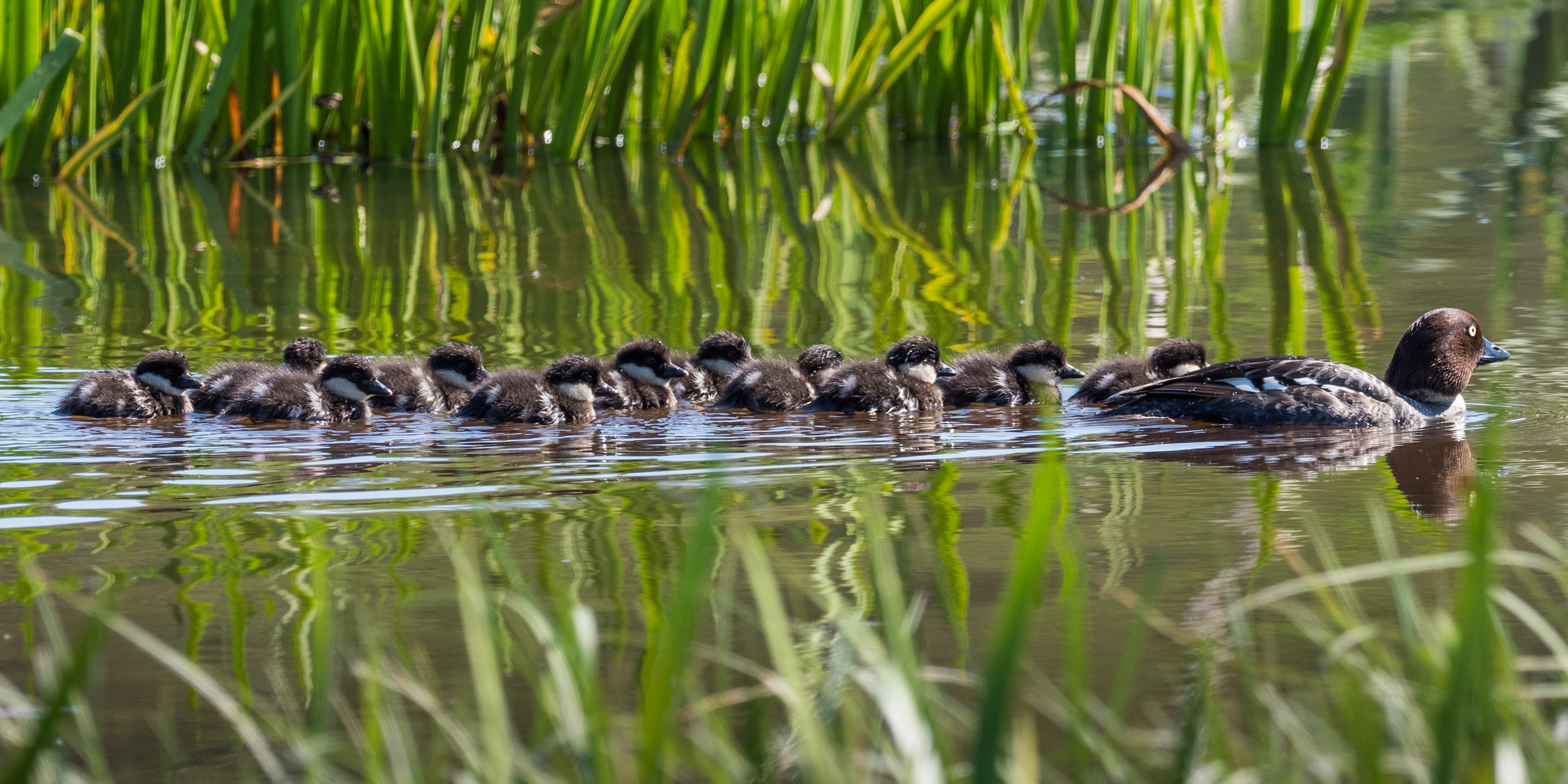
Female goldeneye with chicks

The common goldeneye or simply goldeneye (Bucephala clangula) is a medium-sized sea duck of the genus Bucephala, the goldeneyes. Its closest relative is the similar Barrow's goldeneye. The genus name is derived from the Ancient Greek boukephalos ("bullheaded", from bous, "bull" and kephale, "head"), a reference to the bulbous head shape of the bufflehead. The species name is derived from the Latin clangere ("to resound").

Common goldeneyes are aggressive and territorial ducks, and have elaborate courtship displays.

== Taxonomy ==
The common goldeneye was formally described in 1758 by the Swedish naturalist Carl Linnaeus in the tenth edition of his Systema Naturae under the binomial name Anas clangula. Linnaeus specified the type location as Europe but in 1761 restricted this to Sweden. The common goldeneye is now one of three species placed in the genus Bucephala that was introduced in 1858 by the American naturalist Spencer Baird. The genus name is from Ancient Greek boukephalos meaning "bullheaded" or "large-headed". The specific epithet is from Latin clangere meaning "to resound".

Two subspecies are recognised:

- B. c. clangula (Linnaeus, 1758) – subarctic from Scotland and Scandinavia to Sakhalin and Kamchatka Peninsula (southeast Russia), in south through north Kazakhstan, north Mongolia and Heilongjiang (northeast China)
- B. c. americana (Bonaparte, 1838) – subarctic from west Alaskan mainland to Labrador and New Brunswick, south through northern US

== Description ==
Adult males range from 45–51 cm (18–20 in) and weigh approximately 1,000 g (2.2 lb), while females range from 40–50 cm (16–20 in) and weigh approximately 800 g (1.8 lb). The common goldeneye has a wingspan of 77–83 cm (30.5–32.5 in). The species is named for its golden-yellow eyes. Adult males have a dark head with a greenish gloss and a circular white patch below the eye, a dark back and a white neck and belly. Adult females have a brown head and a mostly grey body. Their legs and feet are orange-yellow.

The subspecies B. c. americana has a longer and thicker bill than the nominate B. c. clangula.

== Distribution and habitat ==
Their breeding habitat is the taiga. They are found in the lakes and rivers of boreal forests across Canada and the northern United States, Scotland, Scandinavia, the Baltic States, and northern Russia. They are migratory and most winter in protected coastal waters or open inland waters at more temperate latitudes. Naturally, they nest in cavities in large trees, where they return year after year, though they will readily use nest boxes as well.

== Behaviour ==
=== Breeding ===
Natural tree cavities chosen for nest sites include those made by broken limbs and those made by large woodpeckers, specifically pileated woodpeckers or black woodpeckers. Average egg size is a breadth of 42.6–44.0 mm (1.68–1.73 in), a length of 58.1–60.6 mm (2.29–2.39 in) and a weight of 61.2–66.6 g (2.16–2.35 oz). The incubation period ranges from 28 to 32 days. The female does all the incubating and is abandoned by the male about 1 to 2 weeks into incubation. The young remain in the nest for about 24–36 hours. Brood parasitism is quite common with other common goldeneyes, and occurs less frequently with other duck species. The broods commonly start to mix with other females' broods as they become more independent or are abandoned by their mothers. Goldeneye young have been known to be competitively killed by other goldeneye mothers, common loons and red-necked grebes. The young are capable of flight at 55–65 days of age.

=== Food and feeding ===
Common goldeneyes are diving birds that forage under water. Year-round, about 32% of their prey is crustaceans, 28% is aquatic insects and 10% is molluscs. Insects are the predominant prey while nesting and crustaceans are the predominant prey during migration and winter. Locally, fish eggs and aquatic plants can be important foods.

== Predators ==
They themselves may fall prey to various hawks, owls and eagles, while females and their broods have been preyed upon by bears (Ursus spp.), various weasels (Mustela spp.), mink (Mustela vison), raccoons (Procyon lotor) and even northern flickers (Colaptes auratus) and American red squirrels (Tamiasciurus hudsonicus).

== Conservation ==
The common goldeneye is one of the species to which the Agreement on the Conservation of African-Eurasian Migratory Waterbirds (AEWA) applies. Around 188,300 common goldeneyes were killed annually by duck hunters in North America during the 1970s, representing slightly less than 4% of the total waterfowl killed in Canada during that period, and less than 1% of the total waterfowl killed in the US. Both the breeding and winter habitats of these birds have been degraded by clearance and pollution. However, the common goldeneye in North America is known to derive short-term benefits from lake acidification.

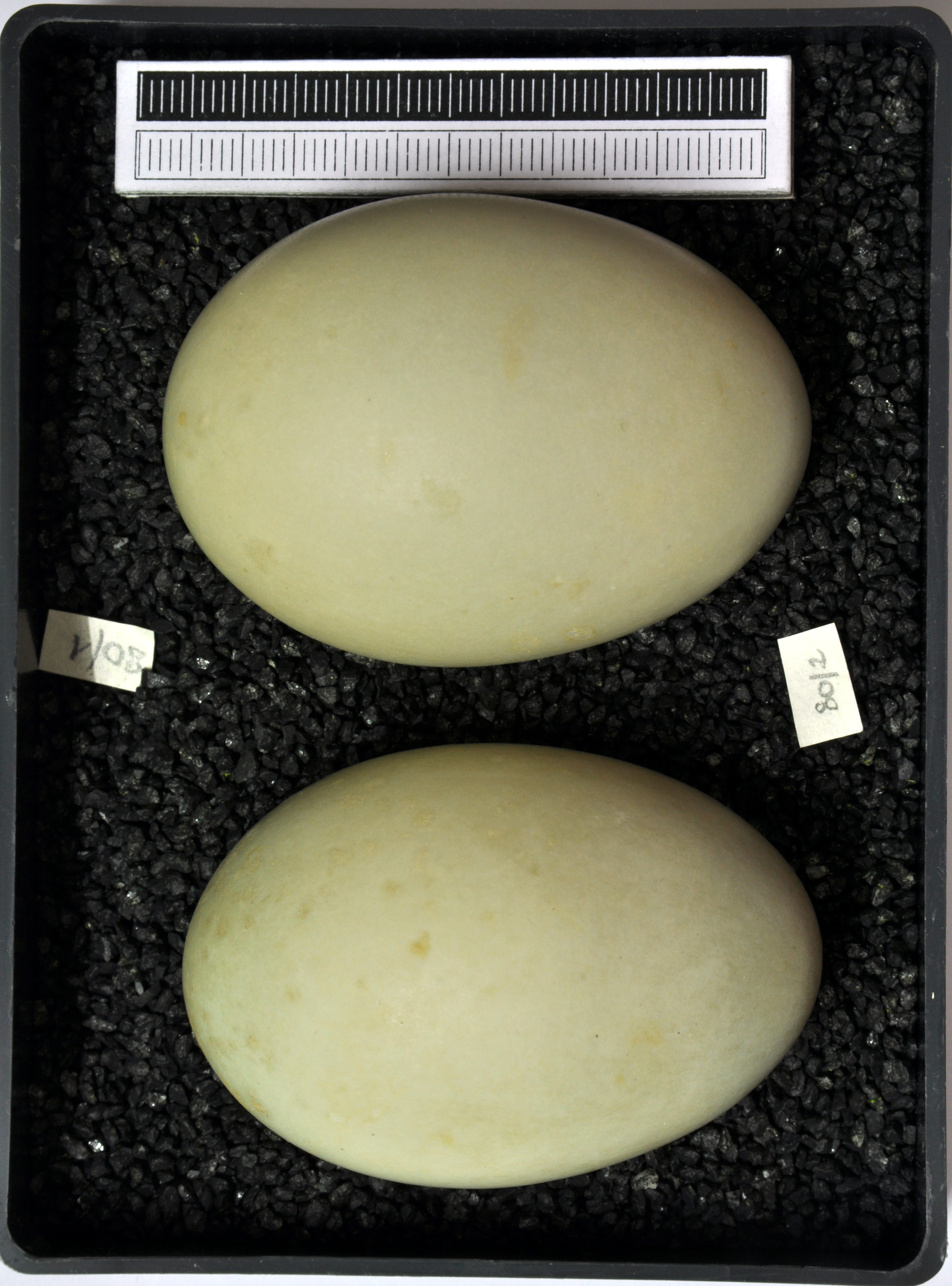
Eggs, Collection Museum Wiesbaden

== Gallery ==
chick

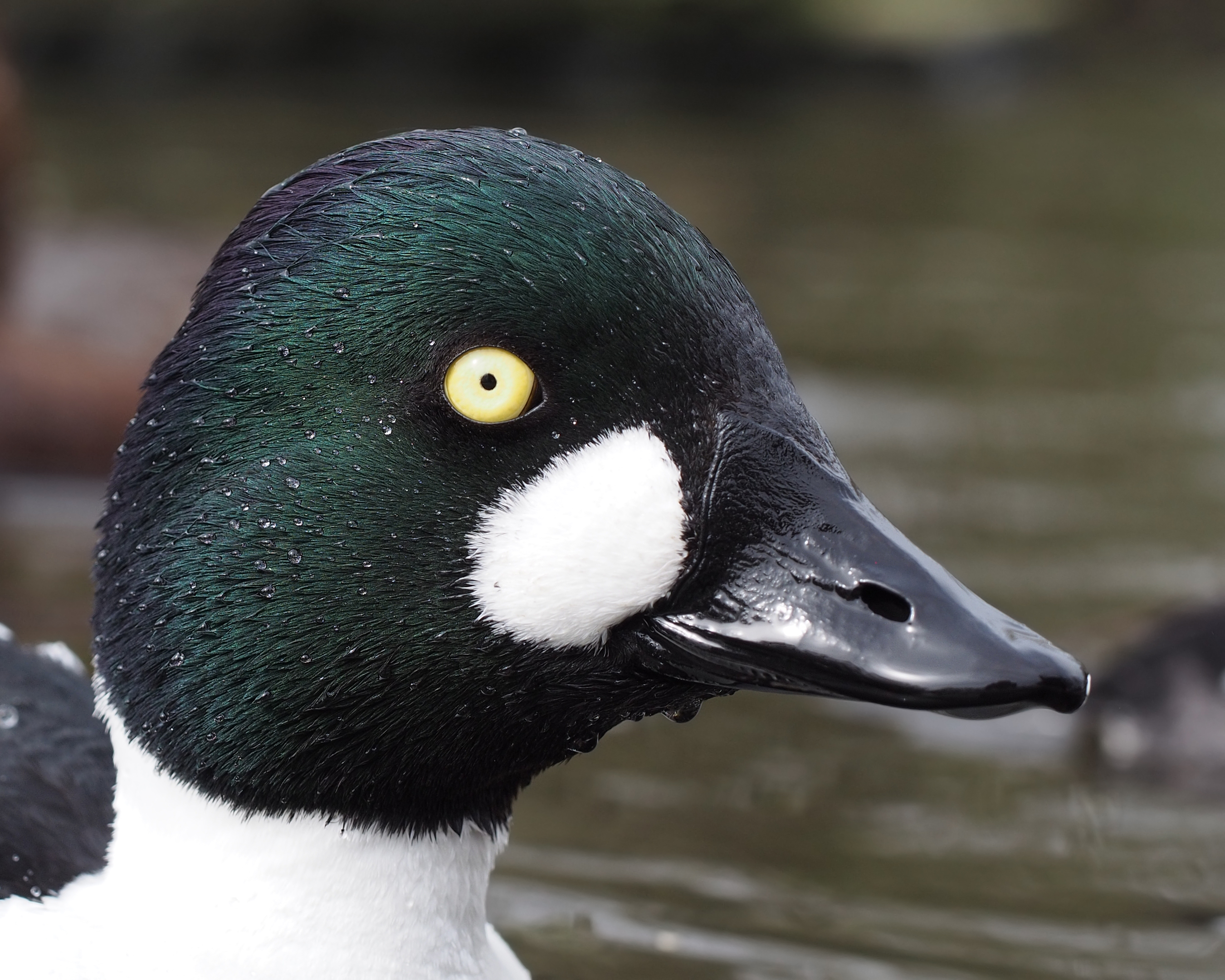
Male

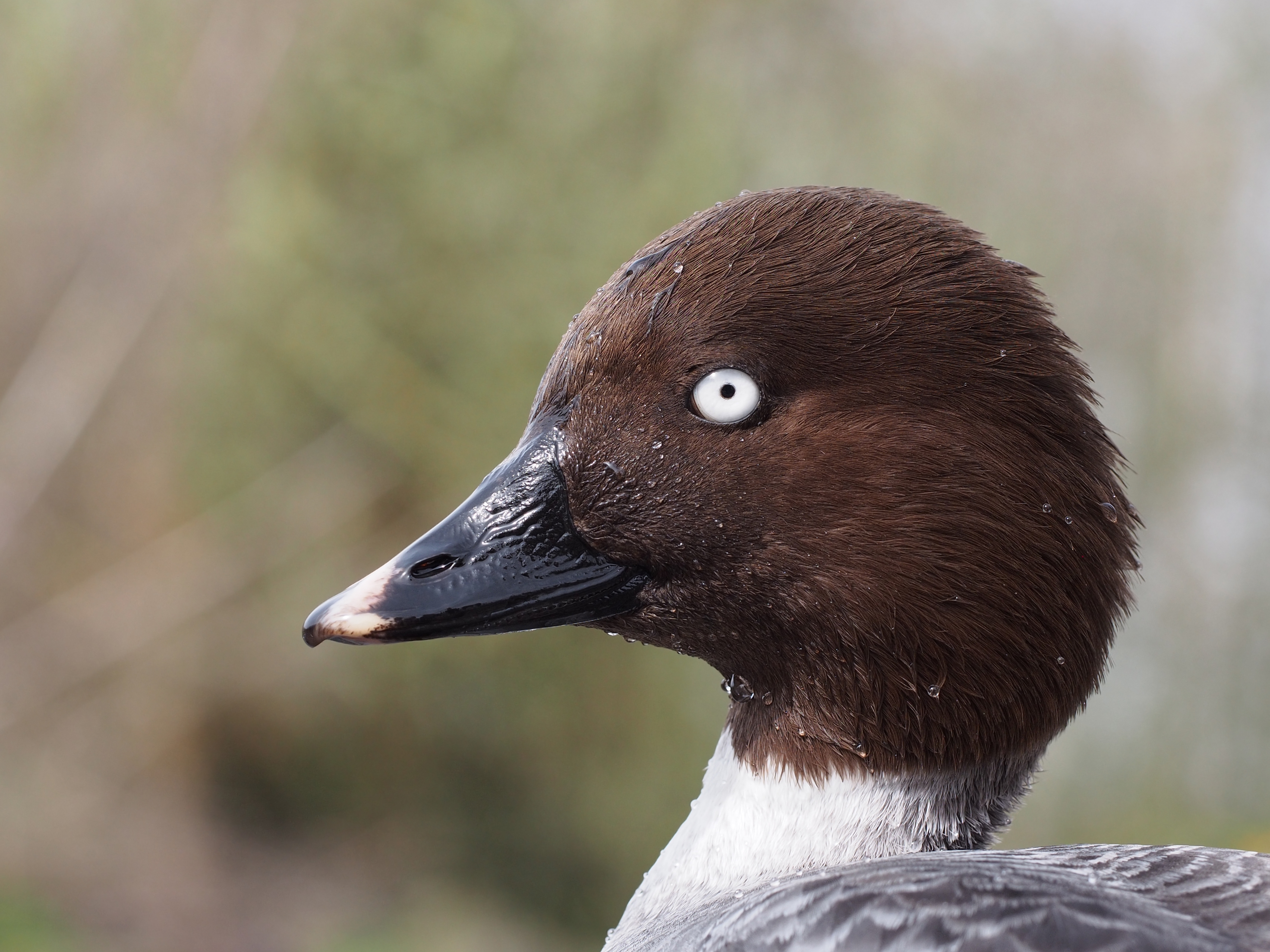
Female

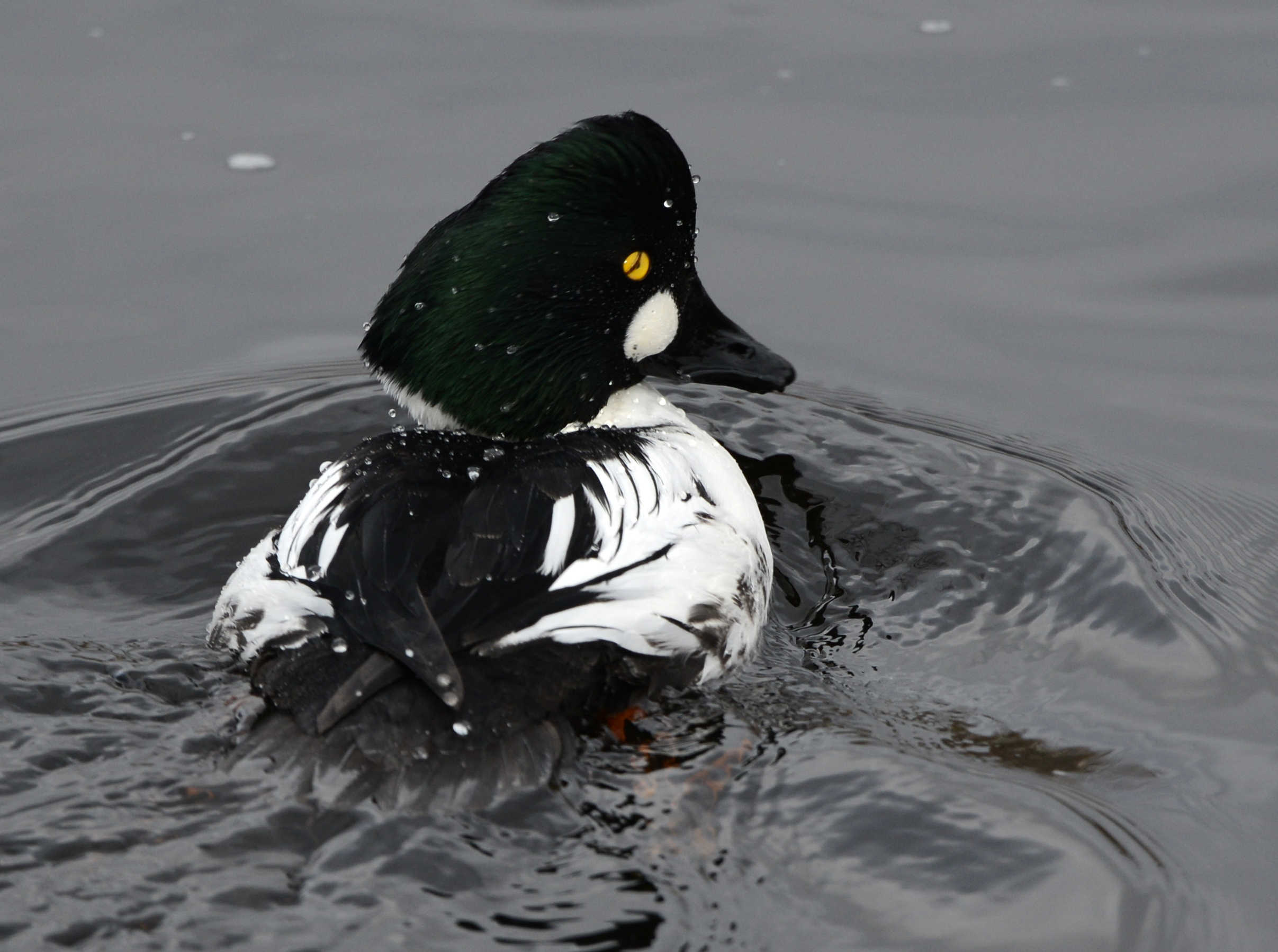
Just after a dive, showing clear nictitating membrane

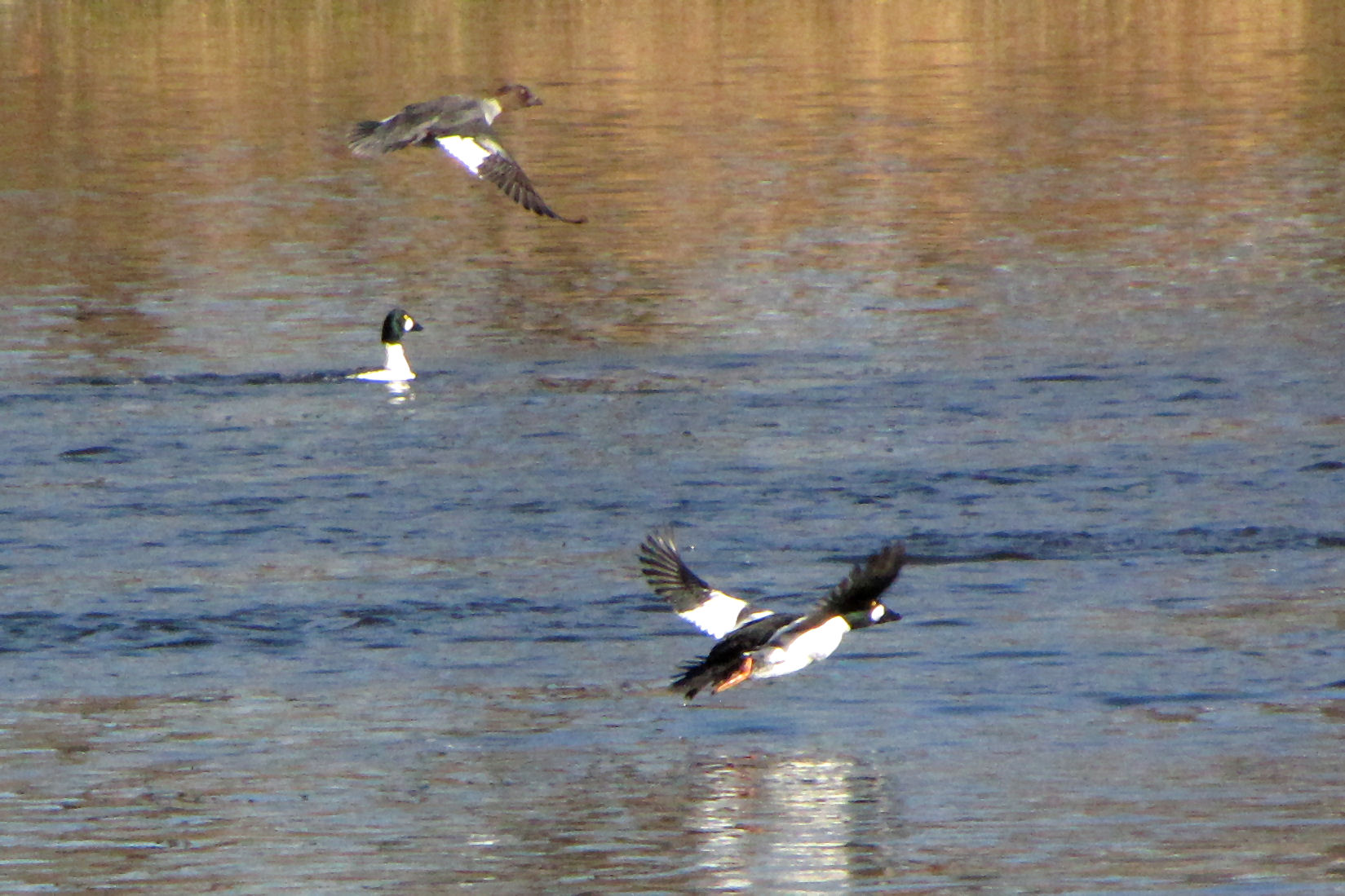
In flight over Rideau River, Ottawa, Ontario

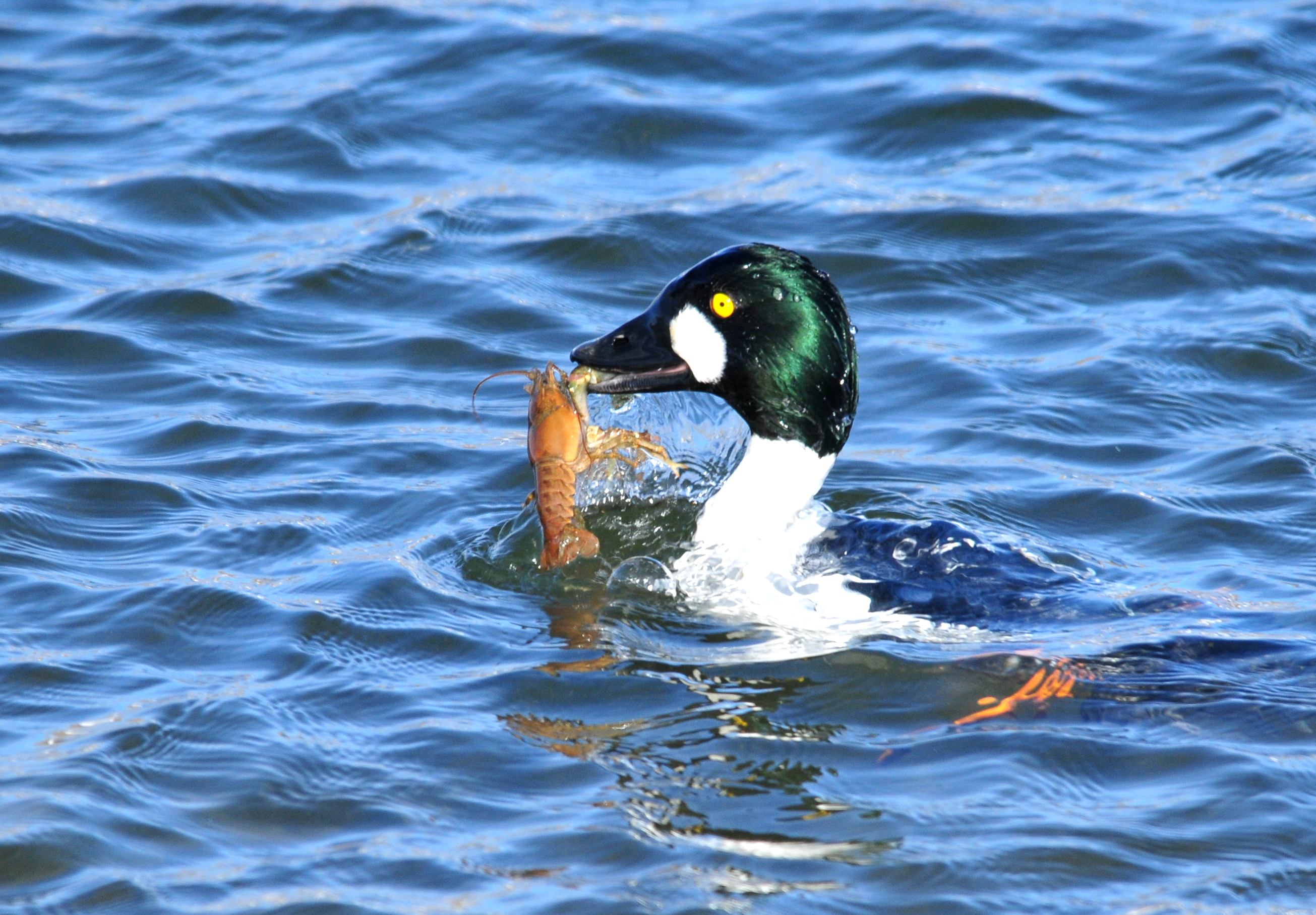
With a northern crayfish (Orconectes virilis)
