= Lead poisoning in raptors =

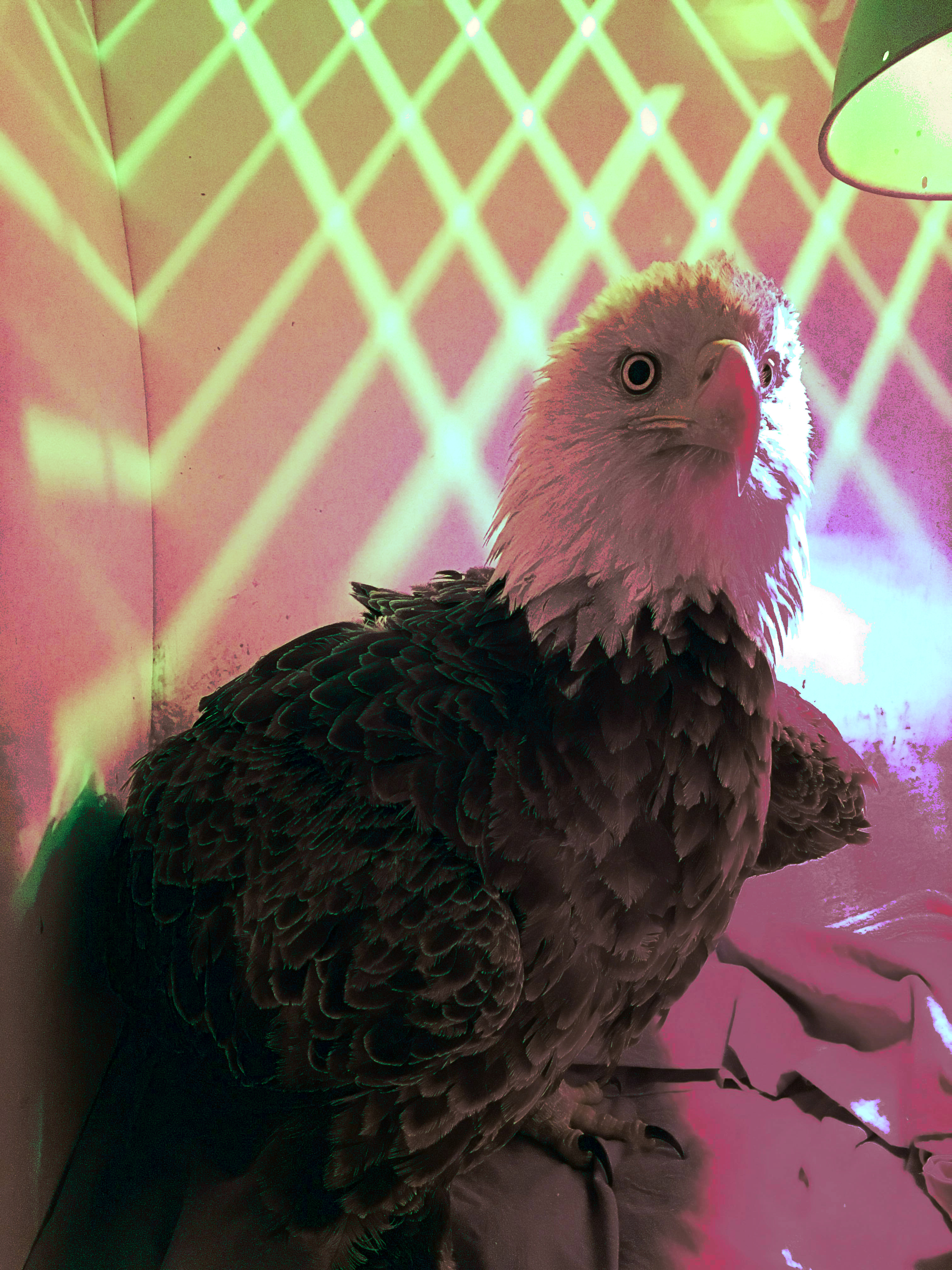
Lead poisoned bald eagle under care at Cobequid Wildlife Rehabilitation Centre

Lead poisoning is a significant health issue affecting the raptor population, amongst other species. Without rehabilitation, many raptors will succumb to the symptoms of lead poisoning once affected. While the general public may not know how they are possibly contributing to the problem, nearly 100% of lead poisoning can be prevented if humans paid close attention to their hunting and angling practices. There are two major contributors to these avian species being affected by lead poisoning and they are through hunters using lead ammunition, or through anglers using lead tackles.

== Exposure to lead ==
When hunters shoot an animal, they often leave the offal and other carcass waste in the woods afterwards. This becomes problematic if the hunter has chosen to use lead bullets. It has been shown that essentially all animals that have been shot with lead contain lead fragments in them. One singular standard 150-grain lead bullet has the ability to kill up to 10 eagles. One study noted that of 38 deer carcasses examined, over 74% of them contained over 100 lead fragments from one bullet. From the point of entry of a bullet into an animal, these small fragments can travel up to 45 centimetres (18 in) into the carcass. Some of these fragments are so small that they cannot be visibly seen, but will show up on x-ray scans of the animal. Predators and scavengers that then find these animal remains and waste will consume these small lead pieces. The fragments are then broken down and the lead is absorbed into the bloodstream due to the grinding action of the gizzard, which thus results in a plethora of health concerns' In terms of fishing tackle, peak fishing season has been found to result in the highest number of mortalities caused by lead tackle. Birds may eat a fish that has consumed a lead jig or sinker if a fishing line breaks. They may also try to attack a fish being pulled in by someone fishing/angling. There is also tackle that becomes disposed of or left behind in the water or on the fishing grounds, which birds may then accidentally consume. What makes this issue even worse is that lead is not an element that is quickly eliminated and cannot be degraded, as it is a very stable element. This results in a continuous accumulation of the concentration of lead in the environment over time, as there is more going in than there is going out. Though not as big of an issue, there are other methods to which wildlife can technically be exposed to lead, such as through lead-based paint or through mining.

== Pathogenesis ==
When lead gets into the digestive tract of raptors, the acidic nature of their stomach allows for the breakdown and absorption into the blood. If lead fragments are only in the tissues of the bird, it is unlikely to cause lead toxicity, as it needs to be broken down by the stomach. Once in the bloodstream, lead has been found to mimic calcium's role in the body, and can takeover the normal cellular pathways and processes that calcium would typically follow. As a result, calcium homeostasis can no longer be maintained once the lead enters the bloodstream. Signal transmissions are then disrupted to the nerve synapses as the cholinergic nerve cells become inhibited, resulting in behavioural change as the cerebellum is affected. The function of the nervous system evidently becomes greatly jeopardized. In the bloodstream itself, the red blood cells develop a decreased lifespan, and less heme synthesis occurs due to the enzymes δ-aminolevulinic acid dehydratase and ferrochelatase becoming impaired. The bird then becomes anaemic.

== Signs and symptoms ==
When birds initially start showing behavioural changes, they might first demonstrate difficulties in landing. They also start demonstrating abnormal head positioning, and often can be found staring at the ground. Their vocalizations may change sound, as it often becomes a high pitched honk, and they might have their beaks partially open with a hissing noise coming out of it. After approximately two weeks, depending, the bird becomes visibly weak, and will commonly display trouble walking and flying. The wings may also start appearing droopy, with the wing tips often seen dragging on the ground, and the birds might put in less effort to acquire food. If the bird survives the 2 to 3 weeks after lead poisoning then it may also begin to appear emaciated and the keel bone may become very distinct due to the digestive tract not being able to digest food as the tract becomes paralyzed. Green feces is often seen on the tail feathers, as a side effect of this.

The severity of the lead concentration in the blood can also do damage to the renal system and the reproductive system, as the kidneys are affected and any egg laid may have weakened shells. Some species of eagles have also been found to have decreased to no production of sperm occur, and the males may experience a decrease in testicular size. It is also not uncommon for birds to experience blindness as a result of the metabolism of vitamins being affected. As a result of all these varying impacts that lead has physically on the eagles, it is not uncommon for these birds to experience muscle tremors or for their lower legs to become paralyzed. Due to the varying degrees of these symptoms that a raptor might be experiencing, wildlife rehabbers may have an easier time holding on and treating the birds as they have less strength available to put up a fight.

== Diagnosis ==
An individual who is experienced with wildlife can most times identify a symptomatic raptor that has lead poisoning. However, acute toxicity is not always as easily identified. The definitive way of determining if a bird has lead poisoning is by taking a blood sample and testing it for lead. The bird is considered normal and typically unaffected by lead if the blood is found to have less than 20μg/dL, though it is not impossible for a symptomatic bird to be under 20μg/dL. A raptor is considered to be experiencing subclinical amounts of lead in their system if its between 20-60 μg/dL. If an eagle has blood levels of lead above 60μg/dL then it is considered to be a clinical case and the chances of the eagle surviving at this point are very slim to none. The liver and bone can also be biopsied to test for lead toxicity though this can only occur after the eagle has already died. Birds can also be x-rayed, as any larger pieces of lead consumed will be visible on it.

== Treatment ==
When treating patients experiencing lead poisoning, the goals are to decrease the absorption of lead into the bloodstream, to get rid of any toxic lead that is absorbed, and to help and support the animal in its recovery. If lead has already been absorbed into the bloodstream, it becomes vital to treat the bird with something that will adsorb to any lead particles through the use of chelating compounds. These compounds will then cause the bird to eliminate the lead from its body by excreting them in its urine. Common medications that are used to deal with this are EDTA (Ethylenediaminetetraacetic acid) and DTPA (diethylenetriaminepentaacetic acid). It is recommended to use intramuscular injections with EDTA even though intravenously are more effective, due to the toxic effect EDTA has on the kidneys. DMSA is a common oral drug that may be used for treatment as well. If an x-ray is taken and lead pieces show up, they can be removed surgically with an endoscope, through gastrotomy, or by gavage into the stomach, though if the pieces are that big the lead poisoning is likely too high for them to be able to survive surgery.

== Education ==
It has been shown that there is a higher quantity of lead toxicity seen during big-game hunting seasons. It has been proven that regulating lead ammunition can reduce the number of birds that are exposed and affected by lead toxicity. The best option is for hunters to switch to non-lead ammunition. Copper ammunition is the most popular alternative and over 90% of hunters say it works just as well or even better than the typical lead bullets, though there are other alloy metal ammunition options that can also be used. Non-lead fishing tackle is also available. If a hunter refuses to switch to a non-lead ammunition as an alternative, then burning the carcass is the next best option. Though burying the carcass is better than leaving it out in the open, the carcass can easily be dug up by rodents and other mammals and then it would also be exposed to raptors again. Hunters should also realize how lead will be in the meat they hunt for food if they use lead ammunition, which isn't safe for human consumption either.

== See also ==
- Animal lead poisoning
