= Animal lead poisoning =

Animal lead poisoning (also known as avian plumbism, or avian saturnism for birds) is a veterinary condition and pathology caused by increased levels of the heavy metal lead in an animal's body.

Lead interferes with a variety of body and natural processes. It is toxic to many organs and tissues including the heart, bones, intestines, kidneys, and reproductive and nervous systems. It mainly affects the haematopoietic system. It also affects the sulfhydryl group containing enzymes and also thiol content of erythrocyte. Furthermore, it inhibits the enzyme delta amino levaminic acid dehydrogenase enzyme (ALA) which is present in the red blood cell. It is therefore particularly toxic to young animals, mainly dogs and cattle.

As in humans, animal lead poisoning may be acute (from intense exposure of short duration) or chronic (from repeat low-level exposure over a prolonged period). Acute intoxication can quickly lead to death.

== Prevalence ==
Lead is now a common environmental pollutant. For the birds, a common source is lead shot, eaten as grit.

== Routes of exposure to lead poisoning ==
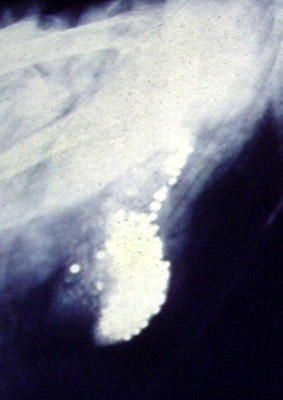
X-Ray of a swan showing pellets in its gizzard

Animals can be exposed to lead through multiple pathways, varying by species, behavior, and environment:

=== Ingestion of lead-contaminated materials ===
Foraging or grazing livestock, such as cattle, may ingest lead particles present in soil or vegetation contaminated by industrial activities or proximity to roads with heavy traffic.

Predatory and scavenging species, including birds of prey and mammals, can consume carcasses containing lead bullet fragments, leading to secondary poisoning.

=== Ingestion of spent ammunition ===
Birds, particularly waterfowl, may ingest spent lead shot, mistaking it for food or grit, which aids in digestion. This behavior has been a significant source of lead poisoning in avian species.

=== Environmental contamination ===
Animals residing near structures with deteriorating lead-based paint or in areas with industrial pollution may ingest or inhale lead particles.

=== Dietary exposure ===
Livestock and poultry can be exposed to lead through contaminated feed or water sources, especially in areas near mining operations or where lead-containing materials are improperly discarded.

=== Maternal transfer ===
Lead can cross the tranplacental barrier and be excreted in milk, leading to exposure in offspring during gestation and nursing.

=== Occupational exposure ===
Working animals involved in activities such as hunting or those living in agricultural settings may be exposed to lead through contact with contaminated environments or materials.

=== Potential human health risks ===
Animals experiencing lead poisoning can indirectly pose risks to human health, primarily through dietary consumption of contaminated meat products or environmental contamination, emphasizing the importance of addressing lead exposure through a One Health approach.

== Prevention ==
The use of alternative metals in shot such as steel and tungsten have been implemented since 1991 in the United States for all migratory bird hunting. Some ammunition manufacturers are producing bullets made of solid copper or a mix of 95% copper and 5% zinc, which are in ways superior to lead bullets. There have been efforts to dredge marshlands to remove the build-up of lead in the sediment from the past, however efforts such as this are expensive.

== Treatment ==
EDTA, a chelating agent, binds a heavy metal, sequestering it.

For precious animals;

- Repeat screening, case
  management to abate sources
- Medical and environmental evaluation,
- veterinary evaluation,
  chelation, case management
- If necessary, veterinary hospitalization, immediate
  chelation, case management.

The mainstays of treatment are removal from the source of lead and, for precious animals who have significantly high blood lead levels or who have symptoms of poisoning, chelation therapy with a chelating agent.

=== Wildlife and lead poisoning ===
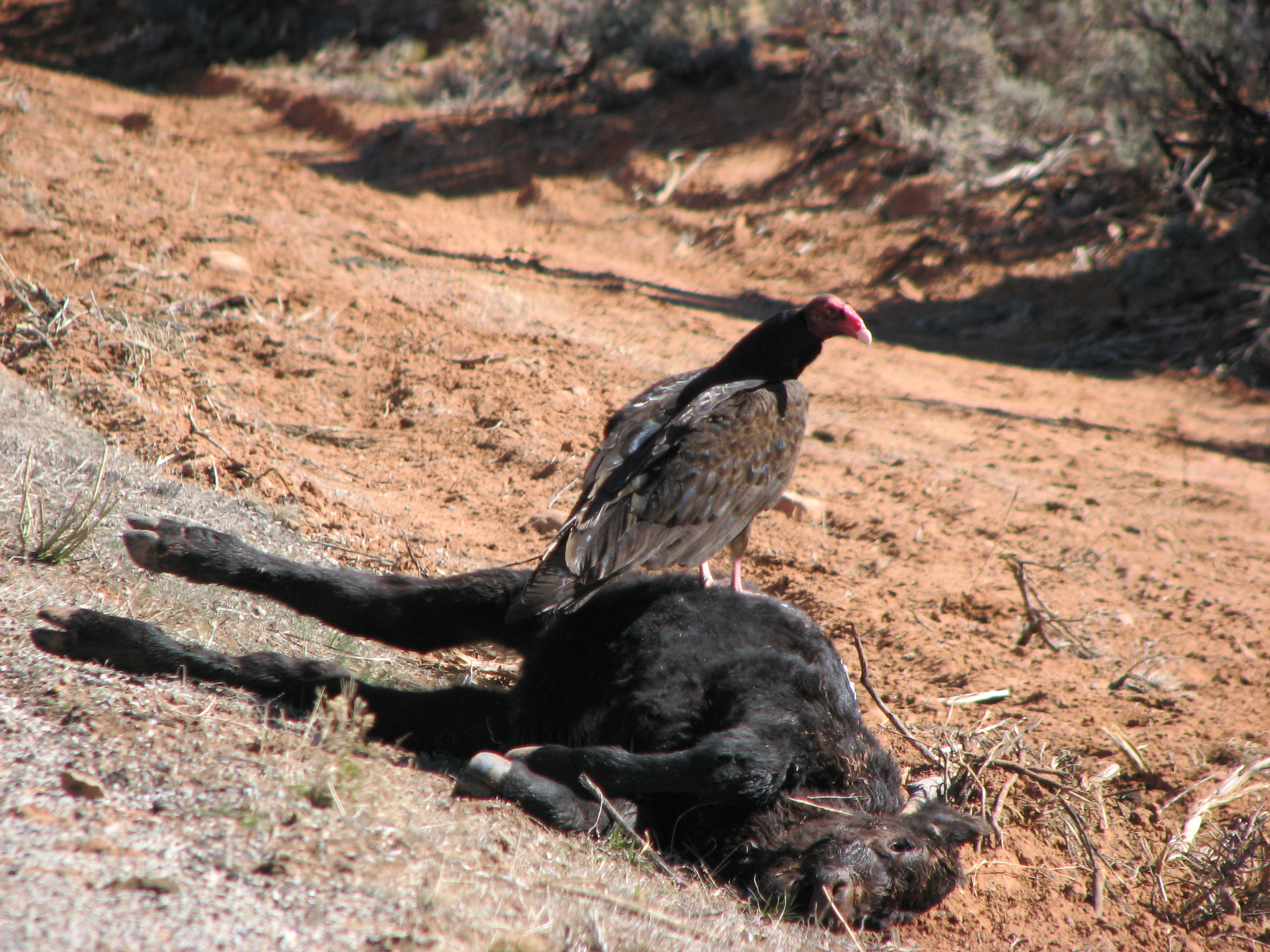
Critically endangered California condor can be poisoned when they eat carcasses of animals shot with lead pellets.

Lead, one of the leading causes of toxicity in waterfowl, has been known to cause die-offs of wild bird populations. When hunters use lead shot, waterfowl such as ducks and other species (swan especially) can ingest the spent pellets later and be poisoned; predators that eat these birds are also at risk. Lead shot-related waterfowl poisonings were first documented in the US in the 1880s. By 1919, the spent lead pellets from waterfowl hunting were positively identified as the source of waterfowl deaths. Lead shot has been banned for hunting waterfowl in several countries, including the US in 1991 and 1997 in Canada. Other threats to wildlife include lead paint, sediment from lead mines and smelters, and lead weights from fishing lines. Lead in some fishing gear has been banned in several countries.

The critically endangered California condor has also been affected by lead poisoning. As scavengers, condors eat carcasses of game that have been shot but not retrieved, and with them the fragments from lead bullets; this increases their lead levels. Among condors around the Grand Canyon, lead poisoning due to eating lead shot is the most frequently diagnosed cause of death. In an effort to protect this species, in areas designated as the California condor's range, the use of projectiles containing lead has been banned to hunt deer, wild pig, elk, pronghorn antelope, coyotes, ground squirrels, and other non-game wildlife. Also, conservation programs exist which routinely capture condors, check their blood lead levels, and treat cases of poisoning.

== Farm animals ==
Cows and horses, as well as pet animals are also susceptible to the effects of lead toxicity. Sources of lead exposure in pets can be the same as those that present health threats to humans sharing the environment, such as paint and blinds, and there is sometimes lead in toys made for pets. Lead poisoning in a pet dog may indicate that children in the same household are at increased risk for elevated lead levels.

== See also ==
- Agreement on the Conservation of African-Eurasian Migratory Waterbirds
- Lead poisoning in raptors

== Cited texts ==
- Brunton, L.L.; Goodman, L.S.; Blumenthal, D.; Buxton, I.; Parker, K.L., eds. (2007). "Principles of toxicology". Goodman and Gilman's Manual of Pharmacology and Therapeutics. McGraw-Hill Professional. ISBN 978-0-07-144343-2.
- Casarett, LJ; Klaassen, CD; Doull, J, eds. (2007). "Toxic effects of metals". Casarett and Doull's Toxicology: The Basic Science of Poisons, 7th edition. McGraw-Hill Professional. ISBN 978-0-07-147051-3.
- Chisolm, J.J. (2004). "Lead poisoning". In Crocetti, M.; Barone, M.A.; Oski, F.A. (eds.). Oski's Essential Pediatrics, 2nd edition. Lippincott Williams & Wilkins. ISBN 0-7817-3770-2.
- Grant, Lester D. (2009). "Lead and Compounds". Environmental Toxicants. pp. 757–809. doi:10.1002/9780470442890.ch20. ISBN 978-0-471-79335-9.
- Kosnett, M.J. (2007). "Heavy metal intoxication and chelators". In Katzung, B.G. (ed.). Basic and Clinical Pharmacology. McGraw-Hill Professional. ISBN 978-0-07-145153-6.
- Olson, K.R. (2007). "Poisoning". In McPhee, S.J.; Tierney, L.M.; Papadakis, M.A. (eds.). Current Medical Diagnosis and Treatment, 46th edition. McGraw-Hill Professional. ISBN 978-0-07-147247-0.
- Rambousek, A.J., ed. (2008). "The symptoms and treatment of industrial poisoning". Industrial Poisoning from Fumes, Gases, and Poisons of Manufacturing Processes. READ BOOKS. ISBN 978-1-4086-7025-5.
- Salvato, J.A.; Nemerow, N.L.; Agardy, F.J., eds. (2003). "Noninfectious and noncommunicable diseases and conditions associated with the environment, including air, water, and food". Environmental Engineering, 5th edition. John Wiley and Sons. ISBN 0-471-41813-7.
- Yu, M.H. (2005). "Soil and water pollution: Environmental metals and metalloids". Environmental Toxicology: Biological and Health Effects of Pollutants. CRC Press. ISBN 1-56670-670-X.
