= Agreement on the Conservation of African-Eurasian Migratory Waterbirds =

International treaty for bird conservation

AEWA
The Agreement on the Conservation of African-Eurasian Migratory Waterbirds
- Official Logo
- Context: Conservation
- Drafted: 16 June 1995
- Location: The Hague
- Effective: 1 November 1999
- Parties: African – 37: Egypt; Niger; Congo; Gambia; Guinea; Senegal; Sudan; Tanzania; Togo; Benin; Mali; Uganda; Mauritius; Kenya; South Africa; Equatorial Guinea; Djibouti; Nigeria; Libya; Tunisia; Ghana; Algeria; Guinea-Bissau; Madagascar; Ethiopia; Chad; Zimbabwe; Gabon; Morocco; eSwatini; Côte d'Ivoire; Burkina Faso; Rwanda; Burundi; Mauritania; Botswana; Central African Republic; Eurasia – 42: Germany; Jordan; Monaco; Netherlands; Spain; Sweden; Switzerland; United Kingdom; Denmark; Finland; Bulgaria; Macedonia; Croatia; Romania; Moldova; Slovakia; Georgia; Albania; Israel; Lebanon; Ukraine; Hungary; Ireland; Syria; Slovenia; France; Luxembourg; Portugal; Uzbekistan; Lithuania; European Union; Latvia; Belgium; Czech Republic; Italy; Cyprus; Norway; Estonia; Montenegro; Iceland; Belarus; Armenia
- Depositary: Government of The Netherlands

The Agreement on the Conservation of African-Eurasian Migratory Waterbirds, or African-Eurasian Waterbird Agreement (AEWA), is an independent international treaty developed under the auspices of the United Nations Environment Programme's Convention on Migratory Species.

== Background ==
The Agreement on the Conservation of African-Eurasian Migratory Waterbirds was drafted on 19 June 1995 in The Hague, Netherlands, in order to coordinate efforts to conserve bird species migrating between European and African nations.

== Description ==
The AEWA is an independent treaty under the auspices of the Convention on Migratory Species, of the United Nations Environment Programme.

The agreement focuses on bird species that depend on wetlands for at least part of their lifecycle and cross international borders in their migration patterns. As of 2023 it covered 255 species.

As of July 2023, its scope covered territories in 119 Range States stretching from the Arctic to South Africa, encompassing the Canadian archipelago and the Middle East as well as Europe and Africa.

== Parties ==
Parties to AEWA
Region	Party Name	Date in Force
Africa	Egypt	1999-01-01
Africa	Niger	1999-01-01
Africa	Congo	1999-11-01
Africa	Gambia	1999-11-01
Africa	Guinea	1999-11-01
Africa	Senegal	1999-11-01
Africa	Sudan	1999-11-01
Africa	Tanzania	1999-11-01
Africa	Togo	1999-11-01
Eurasia	Germany	1999-11-01
Eurasia	Jordan	1999-11-01
Eurasia	Monaco	1999-11-01
Eurasia	Netherlands	1999-11-01
Eurasia	Spain	1999-11-01
Eurasia	Sweden	1999-11-01
Eurasia	Switzerland	1999-11-01
Eurasia	United Kingdom	1999-11-01
Africa	Benin	2000-1-01
Africa	Mali	2000-1-01
Eurasia	Denmark	2000-1-01
Eurasia	Finland	2000-1-01
Eurasia	Bulgaria	2000-2-01
Eurasia	Macedonia	2000-2-01
Eurasia	Croatia	2000-9-01
Eurasia	Romania	2000-10-01
Africa	Uganda	2000-12-01
Africa	Mauritius	2001-1-01
Eurasia	Moldova	2001-4-01
Africa	Kenya	2001-6-01
Eurasia	Slovakia	2001-7-01
Eurasia	Georgia	2001-8-01
Eurasia	Albania	2001-9-01
Africa	South Africa	2002-4-01
Eurasia	Israel	2002-11-01
Eurasia	Lebanon	2002-12-01
Africa	Equatorial Guinea	2003-1-01
Eurasia	Ukraine	2003-1-01
Eurasia	Hungary	2003-3-01
Eurasia	Ireland	2003-8-01
Eurasia	Syria	2003-8-01
Eurasia	Slovenia	2003-10-01
Eurasia	France	2003-12-01
Eurasia	Luxembourg	2003-12-01
Africa	Djibouti	2004-3-01
Eurasia	Portugal	2004-3-01
Eurasia	Uzbekistan	2004-4-01
Africa	Nigeria	2004-7-01
Eurasia	Lithuania	2004-11-01
Africa	Libya	2005-6-01
Africa	Tunisia	2005-7-01
Africa	Ghana	2005-10-01
Eurasia	European Union	2005-10-01
Eurasia	Latvia	2006-1-01
Eurasia	Belgium	2006-6-01
Eurasia	Czech Republic	2006-6-23
Eurasia	Italy	2006-9-01
Africa	Algeria	2006-10-01
Africa	Guinea-Bissau	2006-11-01
Africa	Madagascar	2007-1-01
Eurasia	Cyprus	2008-9-01
Eurasia	Norway	2008-9-01
Eurasia	Estonia	2008-11-01
Africa	Ethiopia	2010-2-01
Africa	Chad	2011-11-01
Eurasia	Montenegro	2011-11-01
Africa	Zimbabwe	2012-06-01
Africa	Gabon	2012-12-01
Africa	Morocco	2012-12-01
Africa	eSwatini	2013-01-01
Africa	Côte d'Ivoire	2013-06-01
Eurasia	Iceland	2013-06-01
Africa	Burkina Faso	2013-10-01
Africa	Rwanda	2014-09-01
Africa	Burundi	2014-10-01
Africa	Mauritania	2015-05-01
Eurasia	Belarus	2016-04-01
Africa	Botswana	2017-11-01
Africa	Central African Republic	2019-01-01

== Meetings ==
The parties meet every few years. As of the end of 2024, there have been eight Meetings of Parties (MoPs):

- 7–9 November 1999 in Cape Town, South Africa
- 25–27 September 2002 in Bonn, Germany
- 23–27 October 2005 in Dakar, Senegal
- 15–19 September 2008 in Antananarivo, Madagascar
- 14–18 May 2012 in La Rochelle, France
- 9–14 November 2015 in Bonn, Germany
- 4–8 December 2018 in Durban, South Africa
- 26-30 September 2022 in Budapest, Hungary

== Treaties ==
=== Ban on lead shot ===
The use of lead shot over wetlands has been banned by the signatories to the convention on account of the poisoning it causes.

== See also ==
- Ramsar Convention
