= Besnard (disambiguation) =

Besnard is a French surname.

Besnard may also refer to:

- Besnard Lake, Canada
- Besnard Point, Palmer Archipelago, Antarctica

== See also ==
- The Besnard Lakes, Canadian indie rock band from Montreal, Quebec, Canada
