= Smith Point =

Smith Point can refer to the following:

- Smith Point County Park, a park in New York, United States.
- Smith Point Light, a lighthouse in Virginia, United States.
- Smith Point, Texas, an unincorporated community in Chambers County, Texas
- Smith Point, Northern Territory, a locality in Australia
  - Smith Point Airport, airport serving the locality
- Smith Point (Antarctica), a point on Wiencke Island in the Palmer Archipelago
