= Saskatchewan Highway 910 =

Provincial highway in Saskatchewan, Canada

Highway 910

Route information
- Maintained by Ministry of Highways and Infrastructure
- Length: 33 km (21 mi)

Major junctions
- South end: Highway 165 near Lac La Ronge First Nation
- North end: Besnard Lake

Location
- Country: Canada
- Province: Saskatchewan

Highway system
- Provincial highways in Saskatchewan
← Highway 909	→ Highway 911

Highway 910 is a provincial highway in the north-west region of the Canadian province of Saskatchewan. It runs from Highway 165 until it transitions into the access road at Besnard Lake for Besnard Lake Recreation Site. Highway 910 was completed in 1973 and is about 33 kilometres (21 mi) long.

== See also ==
- Roads in Saskatchewan
- Transportation in Saskatchewan
