= Smith Point (Antarctica) =

Point of Wiencke Island, Antarctica

Coordinates: 64°49′S 63°29′W

Smith Point is a small point northeast of Besnard Point on the southeast side of the harbor of Port Lockroy, Wiencke Island, in the Palmer Archipelago. Discovered by the French Antarctic Expedition, 1903–05, under Charcot. The name appears on a chart based upon a 1927 survey by DI personnel on the Discovery, but may reflect an earlier naming.
