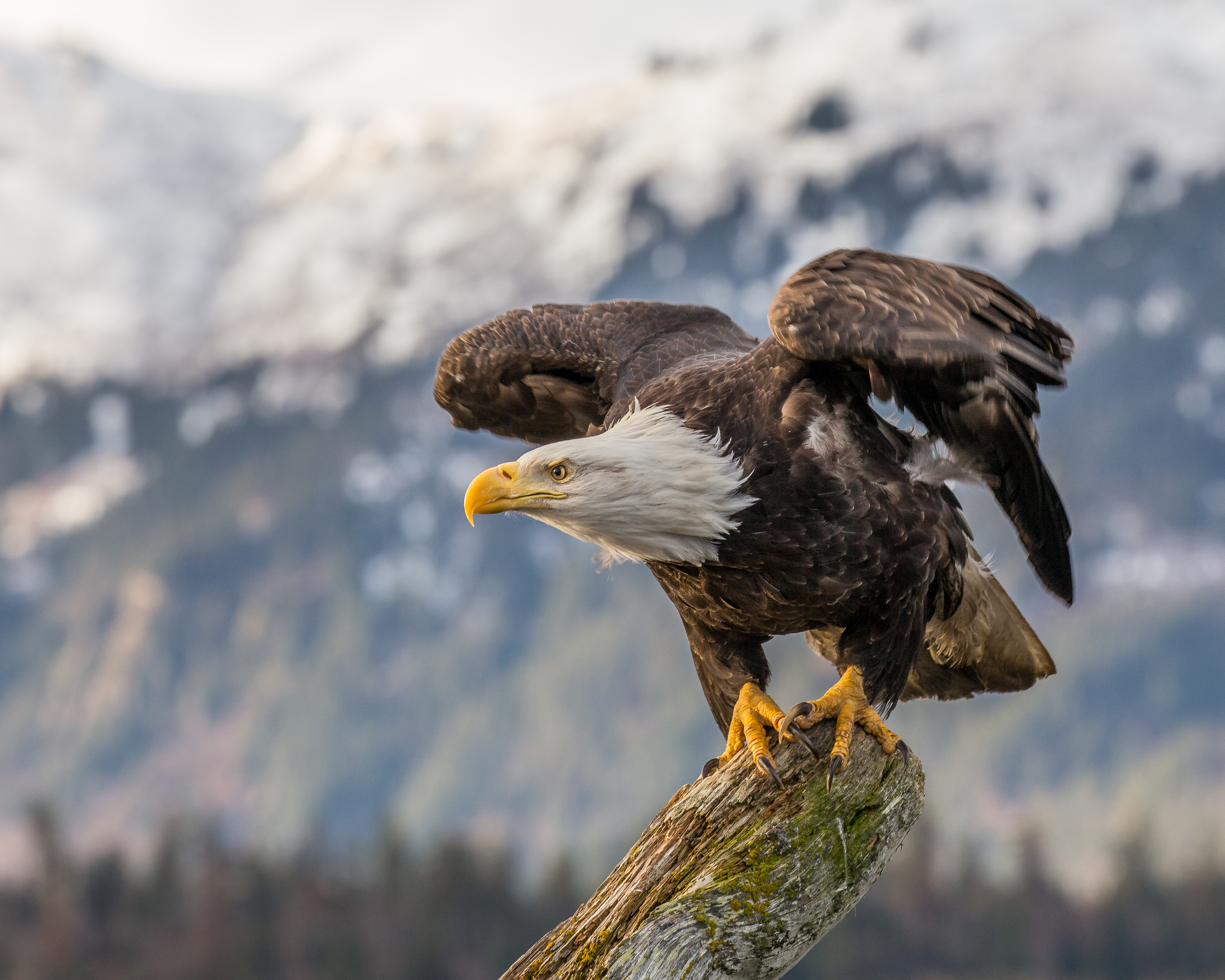
- Bald eagle preparing to fly at Kachemak Bay in Alaska, United States

Conservation status
- Least Concern (IUCN 3.1)
- CITES Appendix II

Scientific classification
- Kingdom: Animalia
- Phylum: Chordata
- Class: Aves
- Order: Accipitriformes
- Family: Accipitridae
- Genus: Haliaeetus
- Species: H. leucocephalus

Binomial name
- Haliaeetus leucocephalus (Linnaeus, 1766)

Subspecies
- H. l. leucocephalus – Southern bald eagle; H. l. washingtoniensis – Northern bald eagle
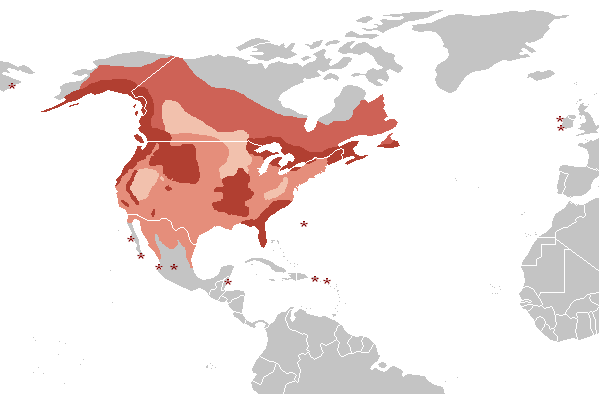
- Bald eagle range Breeding resident Breeding summer visitor Winter visitor On migration only Star: accidental records

Synonyms
- Falco leucocephalus Linnaeus, 1766; Falco pygargus Daudin, 1800 (nec Linnaeus) Falco ossifragus Shaw, 1809 (nec Linnaeus): Haliaeetus leucocephalus alascanus Townsend, 1897 (=H. l. washingtoniensis)

Audio
- A recording of a bald eagle at Yellowstone National Park

= Bald eagle =

Bald eagle Temporal range: Pleistocene-Recent 0.3–0 Ma

Bird of prey species of North America

The bald eagle (Haliaeetus leucocephalus) is a bird of prey found in North America. A sea eagle, it has two known subspecies and forms a species pair with the white-tailed eagle (Haliaeetus albicilla), which occupies the same niche as the bald eagle in the Palearctic. Its range includes most of Canada and Alaska, all of the contiguous United States, and northern Mexico. It is found near large bodies of open water with an abundant food supply and old-growth trees for nesting.

The bald eagle is an opportunistic feeder that subsists mainly on fish, upon which it swoops down and snatches from the water with its talons. It builds the largest nest of any North American bird and the largest tree nests ever recorded for any animal species, up to 4 m (13 ft) deep, 2.5 m (8.2 ft) wide, and 1 metric ton (1.1 short tons) in weight. Sexual maturity is attained at the age of four to five years.

Bald eagles are not bald in the literal sense; the name derives from an older meaning of the word, "white-headed". The adult is mainly brown with a white head and tail. The sexes are identical in plumage, but females are about 25% larger than males. The yellow beak is large and hooked. The plumage of the immature is brown.

The bald eagle is the national bird and national symbol of the United States and appears on its seal. In the late 20th century, it was on the brink of extirpation in the contiguous United States, but measures such as banning the practice of hunting bald eagles and banning the use of the harmful pesticide DDT slowed the decline of their population. Populations have since recovered, and the species' status was upgraded from "endangered" to "threatened" in 1995 and removed from the list altogether in 2007.

== Taxonomy ==
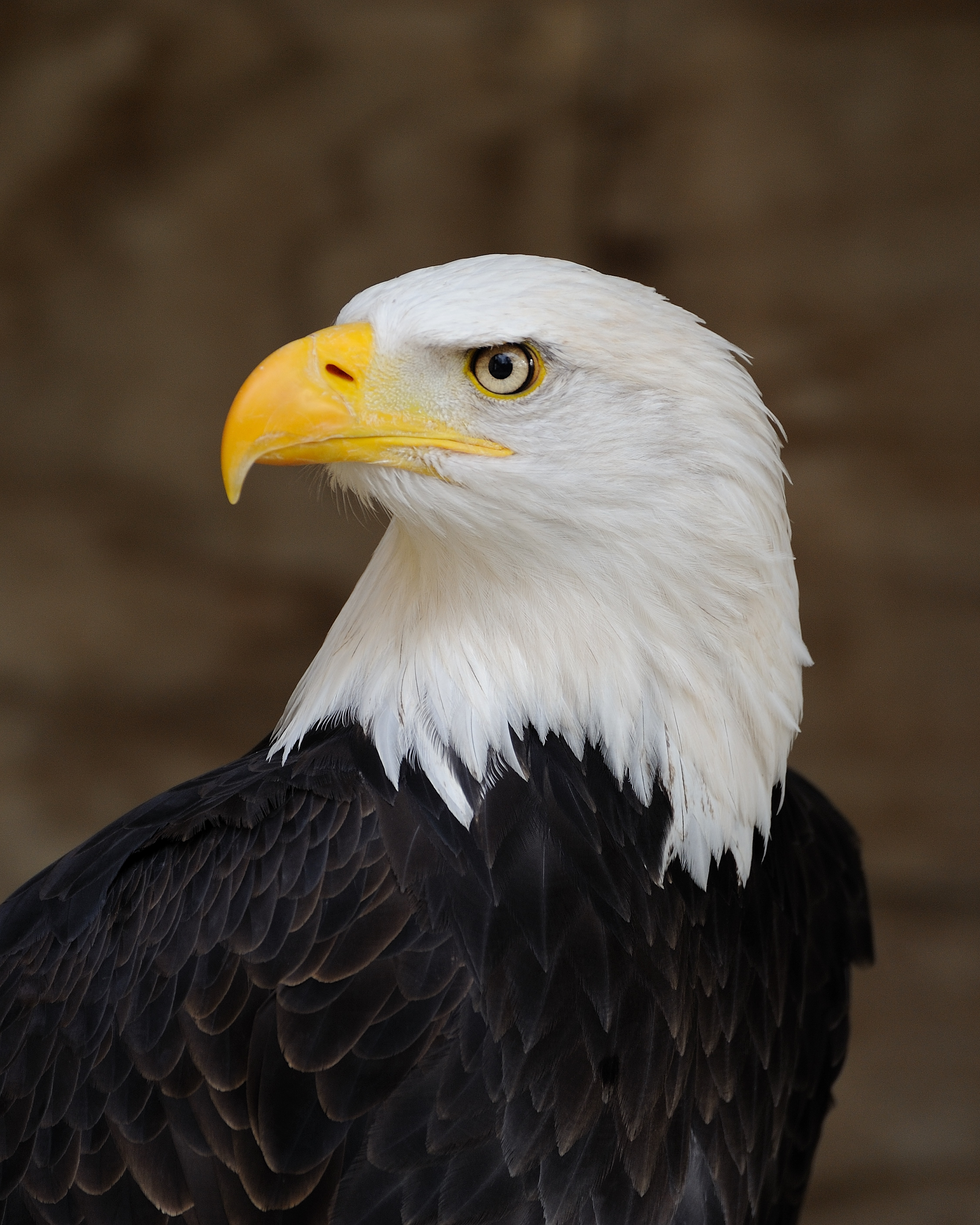
Closeup of the eponymous white head

The bald eagle is placed in the genus Haliaeetus (sea eagles), and gets both its common and specific scientific names from the distinctive appearance of the adult's head. Bald in the English name is from an older usage meaning "having white on the face or head" rather than "hairless", referring to the white head feathers contrasting with the darker body.

The genus name is Neo-Latin: Haliaeetus (from the Ancient Greek: ἁλιάετος, romanized: haliaetos, lit. 'sea eagle'), and the specific name, leucocephalus, is Latinized (Ancient Greek: λευκός, romanized: leukos, lit. 'white') and (κεφαλή, kephalḗ, 'head').

The bald eagle was one of the many species originally described by Carl Linnaeus in his 18th-century work Systema Naturae, under the name Falco leucocephalus.

The bald eagle forms a species pair with the white-tailed eagle of Eurasia. This species pair consists of a white-headed and a tan-headed species of roughly equal size; the white-tailed eagle also has overall somewhat paler brown body plumage. The two species fill the same ecological niche in their respective ranges. The pair diverged from other sea eagles at the beginning of the Early Miocene (c. 10 Ma BP) at the latest, but possibly as early as the Early/Middle Oligocene, 28 Ma BP, if the most ancient fossil record is correctly assigned to this genus.

=== Subspecies ===
There are two historically recognized subspecies of bald eagle, although it is believed these may be the same species with size differences according to Bergmann's Rule.

- H. l. leucocephalus (Linnaeus, 1766) is the nominate subspecies. It is found in the southern United States and Baja California peninsula.
- H. l. washingtoniensis (Audubon, 1827), synonym H. l. alascanus (Townsend, 1897), the northern subspecies, is larger than southern nominate leucocephalus. It is found in the Northern United States, Canada and Alaska.

== Description ==
The plumage of an adult bald eagle is evenly dark brown with a white head and tail. The tail is moderately long and slightly wedge shaped. Males and females are identical in plumage coloration, but sexual dimorphism is evident in the species, in that females are 25% larger than males. The beak, feet and irises are bright yellow. The legs are feather free, and the toes are short and powerful with large talons. The highly developed talon of the hind toe is used to pierce the vital areas of prey while it is held immobile by the front toes. The beak is large and hooked, with a yellow cere. The adult bald eagle is unmistakable in its native range. The African fish eagle (Icthyophaga vocifer) (from far outside the bald eagle's range) also has a brown body (albeit of somewhat more rufous hue), white head and tail, but differs from the bald eagle in having a white chest and black tip to the bill.

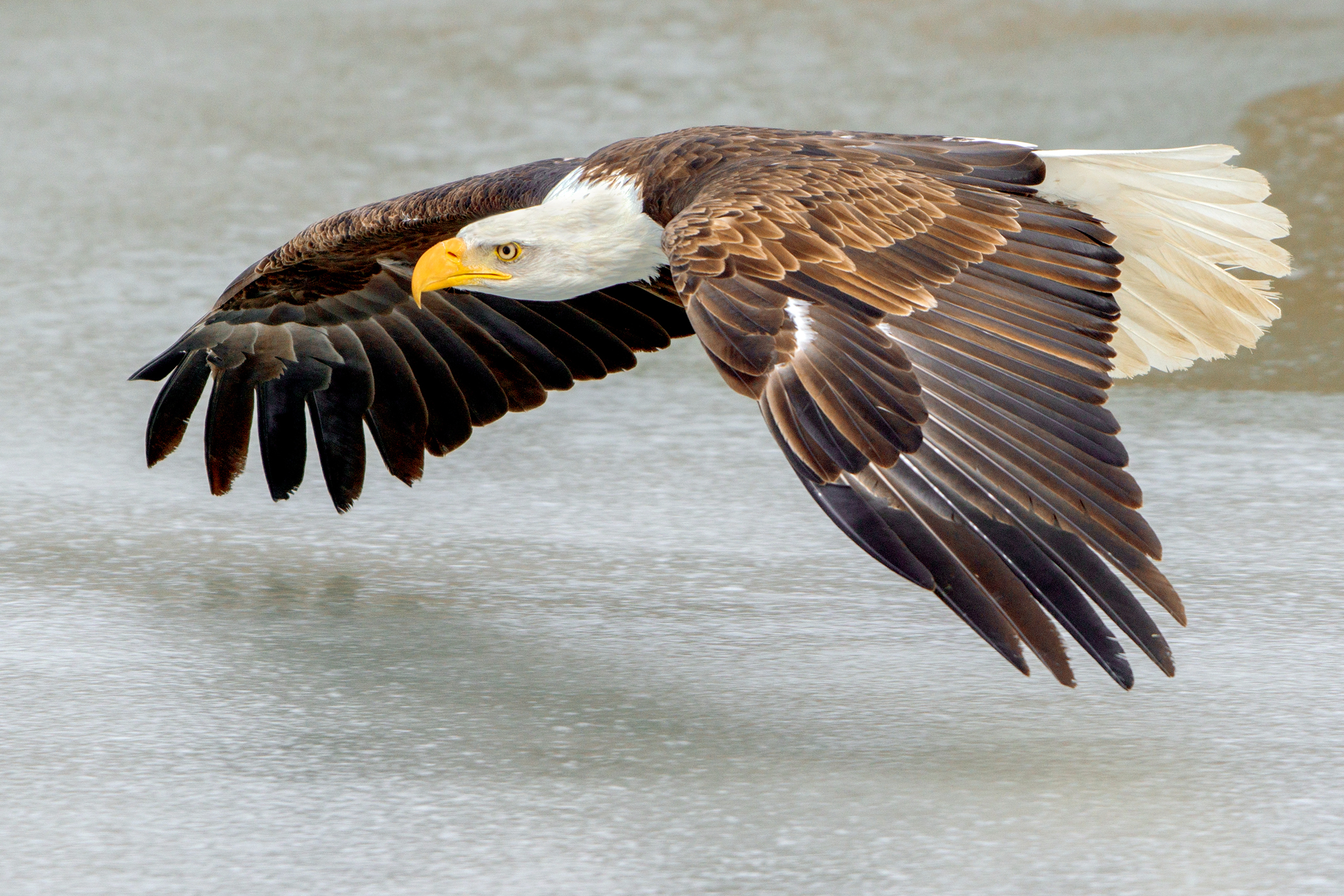
Bald eagle in flight

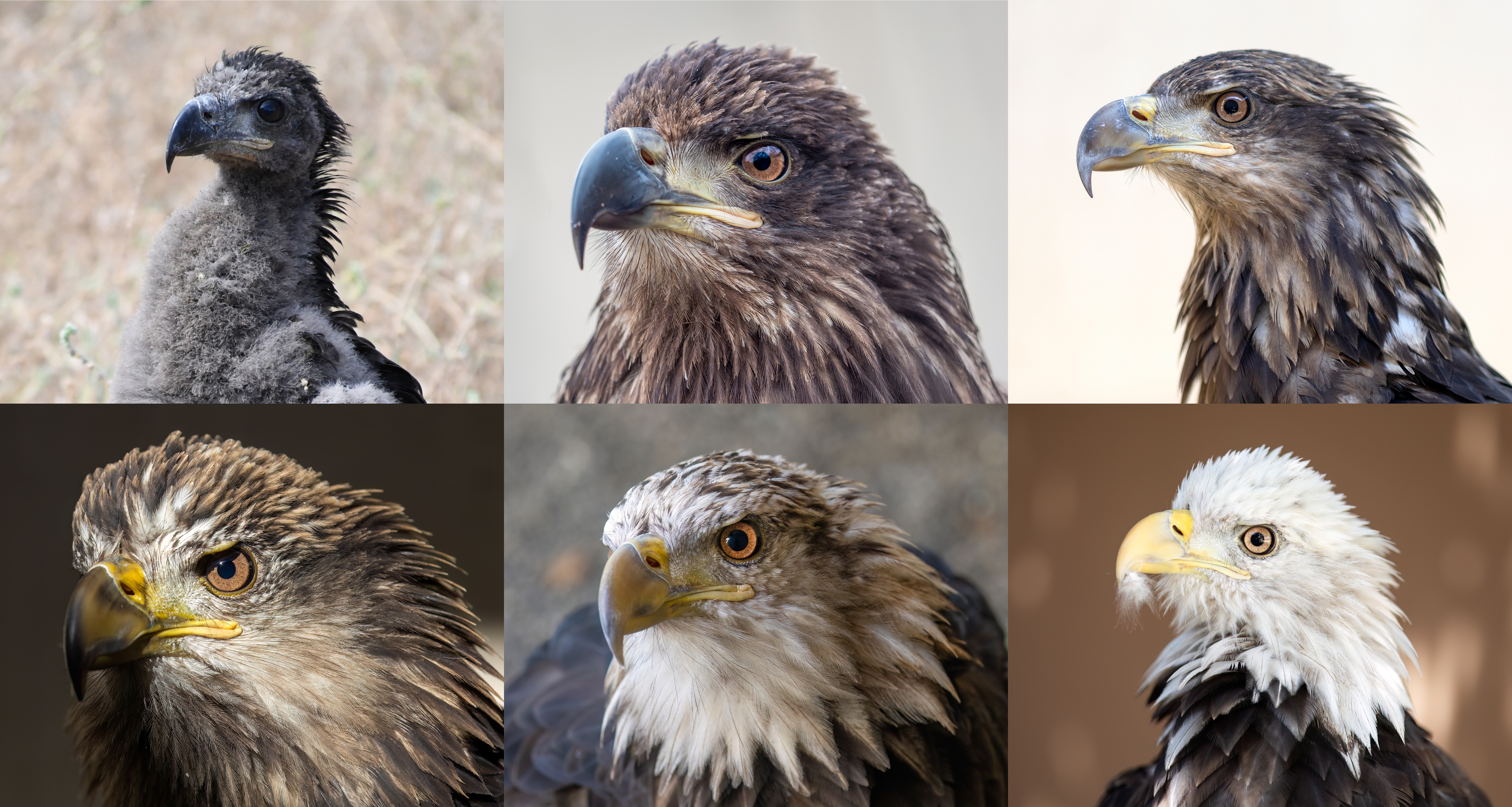
An individual bald eagle at various stages of plumage between nestling and adult. Images show the same bird as a nestling, at 1 year, 2 years, 3 years, 4 years, and 5 years old. Note the lightening of the eye, the yellowing of the beak, and the whitening of the eponymous head.

The plumage of the immature is a dark brown overlaid with messy white streaking until the fifth (rarely fourth, very rarely third) year, when it reaches sexual maturity. Immature bald eagles are distinguishable from the golden eagle (Aquila chrysaetos), the only other very large, non-vulturine raptorial bird in North America, in that the former has a larger, more protruding head with a larger beak, straighter edged wings which are held flat (not slightly raised) and with a stiffer wing beat and feathers which do not completely cover the legs. When seen well, the golden eagle is distinctive in plumage with a more solid warm brown color than an immature bald eagle, with a reddish-golden patch to its nape and (in immature birds) a highly contrasting set of white squares on the wing.

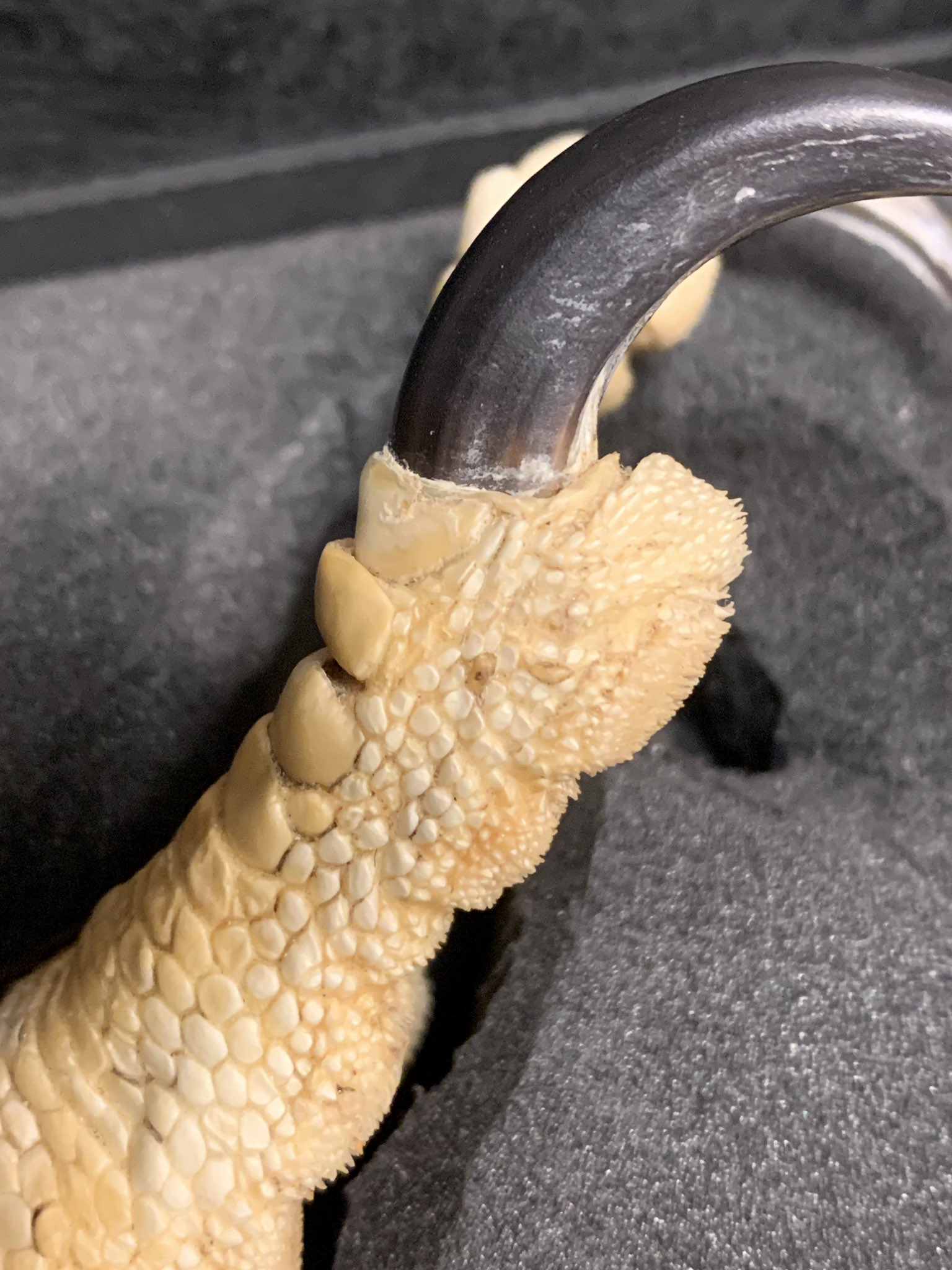
Closeup of a museum specimen's foot, showing the toepads' spiny papillae

The bald eagle has sometimes been considered the largest true raptor (accipitrid) in North America. The only larger species of raptor-like bird is the California condor (Gymnogyps californianus), a New World vulture that today is not generally considered a taxonomic ally of true accipitrids. However, the golden eagle, averaging 4.18 kg (9.2 lb) and 63 cm (25 in) in wing chord length in its American race (Aquila chrysaetos canadensis), is merely 455 g (1.003 lb) lighter in mean body mass and exceeds the bald eagle in mean wing chord length by around 3 cm (1.2 in). Additionally, the bald eagle's close cousins, the relatively longer-winged but shorter-tailed white-tailed eagle and the overall larger Steller's sea eagle (Haliaeetus pelagicus), may, rarely, wander to coastal Alaska from Asia.

The bald eagle has a body length of 70–102 cm (28–40 in). Typical wingspan is between 1.8 and 2.3 m (5 ft 11 in and 7 ft 7 in) and mass is normally between 3 and 6.3 kg (6.6 and 13.9 lb). Females are about 25% larger than males, averaging as much as 5.6 kg (12 lb), and against the males' average weight of 4.1 kg (9.0 lb).

The size of the bird varies by location and generally corresponds with Bergmann's rule: the species increases in size further away from the equator and the tropics. For example, eagles from South Carolina average 3.27 kg (7.2 lb) in mass and 1.88 m (6 ft 2 in) in wingspan, smaller than their northern counterparts. One field guide in Florida listed similarly small sizes for bald eagles there, at about 4.13 kg (9.1 lb). Of intermediate size, 117 migrant bald eagles in Glacier National Park were found to average 4.22 kg (9.3 lb) but this was mostly (possibly post-dispersal) juvenile eagles, with six adults here averaging 4.3 kg (9.5 lb). Wintering eagles in Arizona (winter weights are usually the highest of the year since, like many raptors, they spend the highest percentage of time foraging during winter) were found to average 4.74 kg (10.4 lb).

The largest eagles are from Alaska, where large females may weigh more than 7 kg (15 lb) and span 2.44 m (8 ft 0 in) across the wings. A survey of adult weights in Alaska showed that females there weighed on average 5.35 kg (11.8 lb), respectively, and males weighed 4.23 kg (9.3 lb) against immatures which averaged 5.09 kg (11.2 lb) and 4.05 kg (8.9 lb) in the two sexes. An Alaskan adult female eagle that was considered outsized weighed some 7.4 kg (16 lb). R.S. Palmer listed a record from 1876 in Wyoming County, New York of an enormous adult bald eagle that was shot and reportedly scaled 8.2 kg (18 lb). Among standard linear measurements, the wing chord is 51.5–69 cm (20.3–27.2 in), the tail is 23–37 cm (9.1–14.6 in) long, and the tarsus is 8 to 11 cm (3.1 to 4.3 in). The culmen reportedly ranges from 3 to 7.5 cm (1.2 to 3.0 in), while the measurement from the gape to the tip of the bill is 7–9 cm (2.8–3.5 in). The bill size is unusually variable: Alaskan eagles can have up to twice the bill length of birds from the Southern United States (Georgia, Louisiana, Florida), with means including both sexes of 6.83 cm (2.69 in) and 4.12 cm (1.62 in) in culmen length, respectively, from these two areas.

The call consists of weak staccato, chirping whistles, kleek kik ik ik ik, somewhat similar in cadence to a gull's call. The calls of young birds tend to be harsher and shriller than those of adults.

== Range ==
The bald eagle's natural range covers most of North America, including most of Canada, all of the continental United States, and northern Mexico. It is the only sea eagle endemic to North America. Occupying varied habitats from the bayous of Louisiana to the Sonoran Desert and the eastern deciduous forests of Quebec and New England, northern birds are migratory, while southern birds are resident, remaining on their breeding territory all year. At minimum population, in the 1950s, it was largely restricted to Alaska, the Aleutian Islands, northern and eastern Canada, and Florida. From 1966 to 2015 bald eagle numbers increased substantially throughout its winter and breeding ranges, and as of 2018 the species nests in every continental state and province in the United States and Canada.

The majority of bald eagles in Canada are found along the British Columbia coast while large populations are found in the forests of Alberta, Saskatchewan, Manitoba and Ontario. Bald eagles also congregate in certain locations in winter. From November until February, one to two thousand birds winter in Squamish, British Columbia, about halfway between Vancouver and Whistler. In March 2024, bald eagles were found nesting in Toronto for the first time. The birds primarily gather along the Squamish and Cheakamus Rivers, attracted by the salmon spawning in the area. Similar congregations of wintering bald eagles at open lakes and rivers, wherein fish are readily available for hunting or scavenging, are observed in the Northern United States.

It has occurred as a vagrant twice in Ireland; a juvenile was shot illegally in County Fermanagh on January 11, 1973 (misidentified at first as a white-tailed eagle), and an exhausted juvenile was captured near Castleisland in County Kerry on November 15, 1987. There is also a record of it from Llyn Coron in Anglesey, United Kingdom, from October 17, 1978; the provenance of this individual eagle has remained in dispute.

== Habitat ==
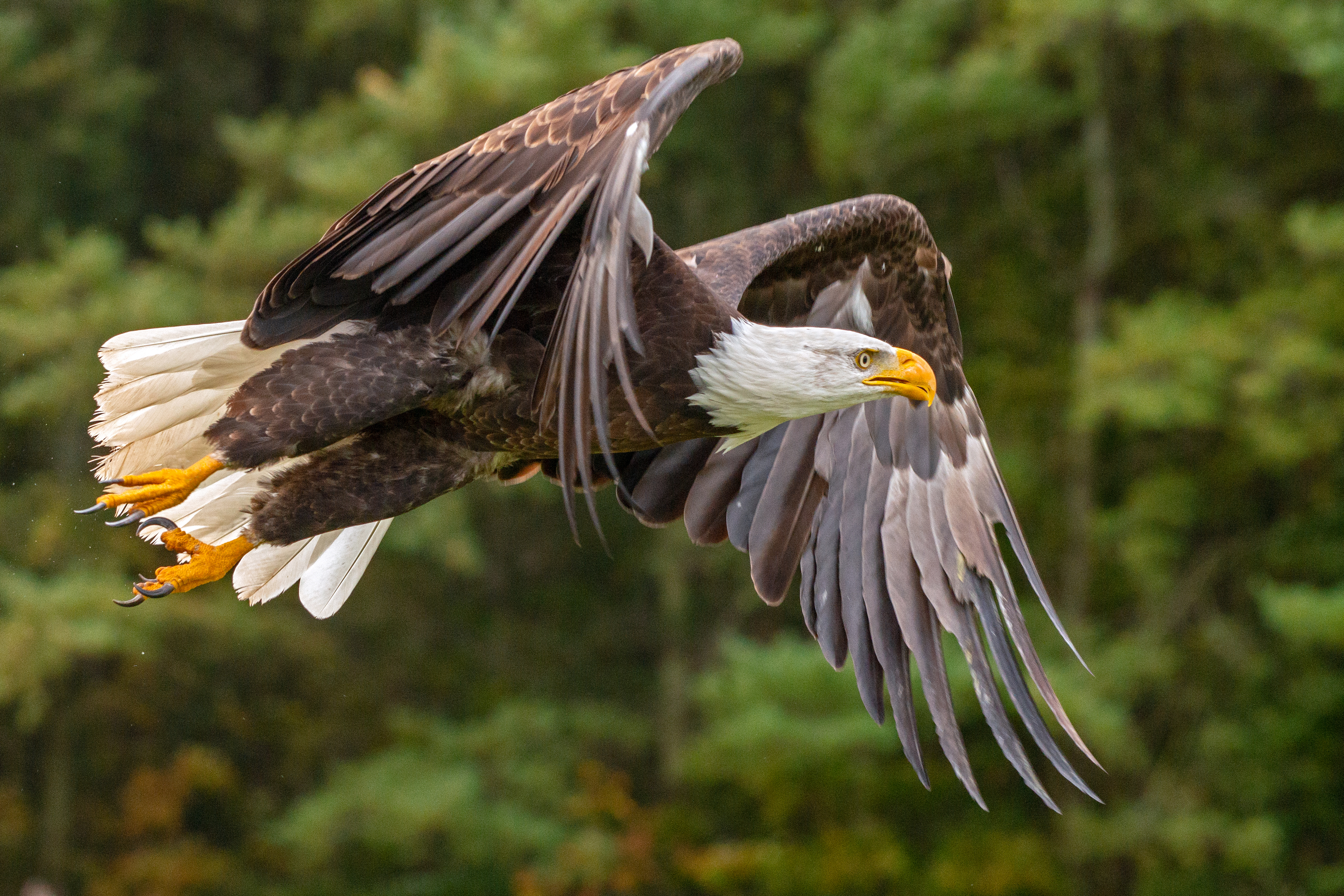
In flight during a licensed performance in Ontario, Canada

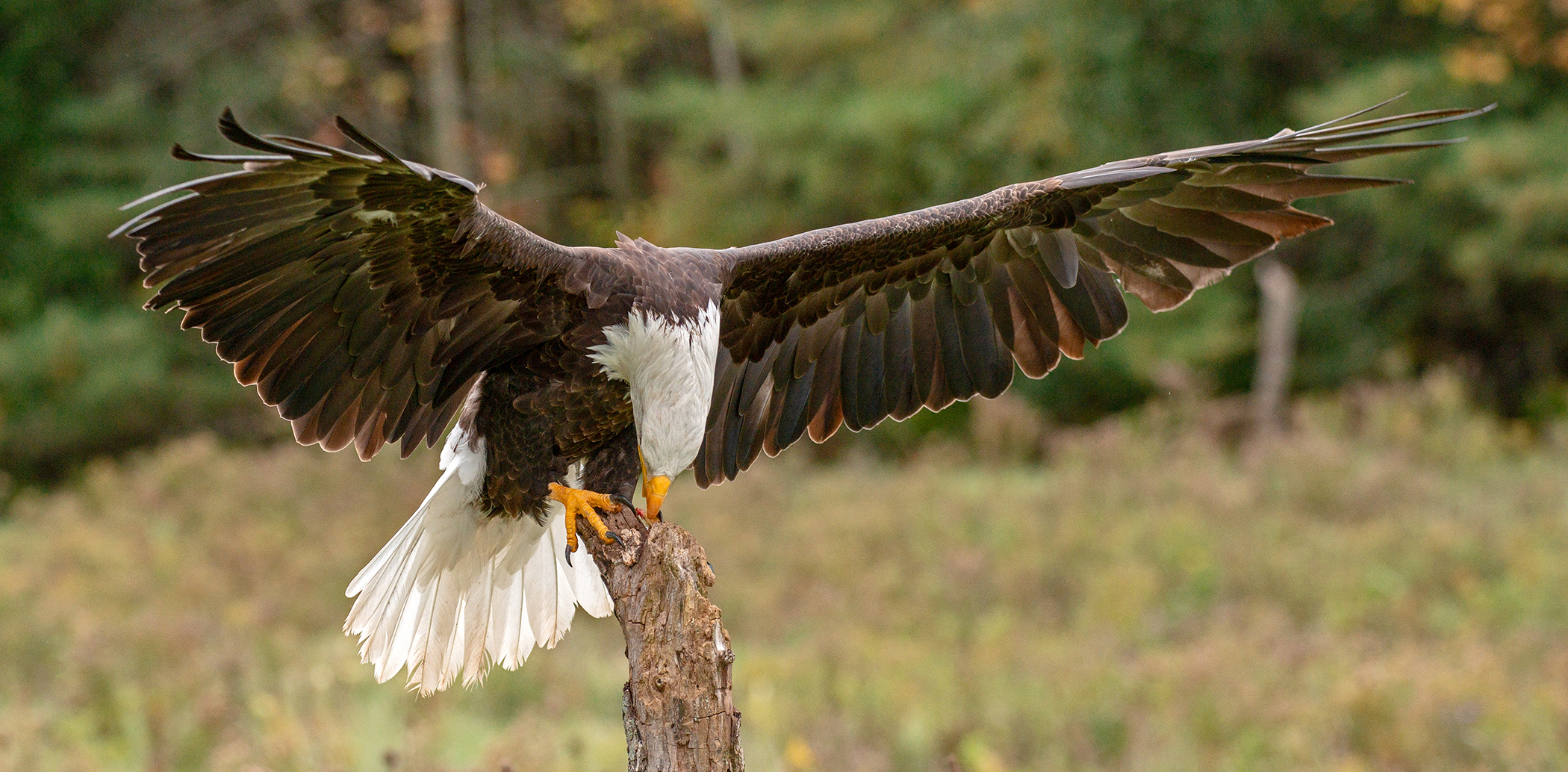
During training at the Canadian Raptor Conservancy

The bald eagle occurs during its breeding season in virtually any kind of American wetland habitat such as seacoasts, rivers, large lakes or marshes or other large bodies of open water with an abundance of fish. Studies have shown a preference for bodies of water with a circumference greater than 11 km (7 mi), and lakes with an area greater than 10 km^{2} (4 sq mi) are optimal for breeding bald eagles.

The bald eagle typically requires old-growth and mature stands of coniferous or hardwood trees for perching, roosting, and nesting. Tree species reportedly is less important to the eagle pair than the tree's height, composition and location. Perhaps of paramount importance for this species is an abundance of comparatively large trees surrounding the body of water. Selected trees must have good visibility, be over 20 m (66 ft) tall, an open structure, and proximity to prey. If nesting trees are in standing water such as in a mangrove swamp, the nest can be located fairly low, at as low as 6 m (20 ft) above the ground. In a more typical tree standing on dry ground, nests may be located from 16 to 38 m (52 to 125 ft) in height. In Chesapeake Bay, nesting trees averaged 82 cm (32 in) in diameter and 28 m (92 ft) in total height, while in Florida, the average nesting tree stands 23 m (75 ft) high and is 23 cm (9.1 in) in diameter. Trees used for nesting in the Greater Yellowstone area average 27 m (89 ft) high. Trees or forest used for nesting should have a canopy cover of no more than 60%, and no less than 20%, and be in close proximity to water. Most nests have been found within 200 m (660 ft) of open water. The greatest distance from open water recorded for a bald eagle nest was over 3 km (1.9 mi), in Florida.

Bald eagle nests are often very large in order to compensate for size of the birds. The largest recorded nest was found in Florida in 1963, and was measured at 2.9 m (9.5 ft) wide and 6.1 m (20 ft) deep.

In Florida, nesting habitats often consist of mangrove swamps, the shorelines of lakes and rivers, pinelands, seasonally flooded flatwoods, hardwood swamps, and open prairies and pastureland with scattered tall trees. Favored nesting trees in Florida are slash pines (Pinus elliottii), longleaf pines (P. palustris), loblolly pines (P. taeda) and cypress trees, but for the southern coastal areas where mangroves are usually used. In Wyoming, groves of mature cottonwoods or tall pines found along streams and rivers are typical bald eagle nesting habitats. Wyoming eagles may inhabit habitat types ranging from large, old-growth stands of ponderosa pines (Pinus ponderosa) to narrow strips of riparian trees surrounded by rangeland. In Southeast Alaska, Sitka spruce (Picea sitchensis) provided 78% of the nesting trees used by eagles, followed by hemlocks (Tsuga) at 20%. Increasingly, eagles nest near human-made reservoirs stocked with fish.

The bald eagle is usually quite sensitive to human activity while nesting, and is found most commonly in areas with minimal human disturbance. It chooses sites more than 1.2 km (0.75 mi) from low-density human disturbance and more than 1.8 km (1.1 mi) from medium- to high-density human disturbance. However, bald eagles will occasionally nest in large estuaries or secluded groves within major cities, such as Hardtack Island on the Willamette River in Portland, Oregon, or John Heinz National Wildlife Refuge at Tinicum in Philadelphia, Pennsylvania, which are surrounded by a great quantity of human activity. Even more contrary to the usual sensitivity to disturbance, a family of bald eagles moved to the Harlem neighborhood in New York City in 2010.

While wintering, bald eagles tend to be less habitat and disturbance sensitive. They will commonly congregate at spots with plentiful perches and waters with plentiful prey and (in northern climes) partially unfrozen waters. Alternately, non-breeding or wintering bald eagles, particularly in areas with a lack of human disturbance, spend their time in various upland, terrestrial habitats sometimes quite far away from waterways. In the northern half of North America (especially the interior portion), this terrestrial inhabitance by bald eagles tends to be especially prevalent because unfrozen water may not be accessible. Upland wintering habitats often consist of open habitats with concentrations of medium-sized mammals, such as prairies, meadows or tundra, or open forests with regular carrion access.

== Behavior ==
The bald eagle is a powerful flier, and soars on thermal convection currents. It reaches speeds of 56–70 km/h (35–43 mph) when gliding and flapping, and about 48 km/h (30 mph) while carrying fish. Its dive speed is between 120–160 km/h (75–99 mph), though it seldom dives vertically. Regarding their flying abilities, despite being morphologically less well adapted to faster flight than golden eagles (especially during dives), the bald eagle is considered surprisingly maneuverable in flight. Bald eagles have also been recorded catching up to and then swooping under geese in flight, turning over and thrusting their talons into the other bird's breast. It is partially migratory, depending on location. If its territory has access to open water, it remains there year-round, but if the body of water freezes during the winter, making it impossible to obtain food, it migrates to the south or to the coast. A number of populations are subject to post-breeding dispersal, mainly in juveniles; Florida eagles, for example, will disperse northwards in the summer. The bald eagle selects migration routes which take advantage of thermals, updrafts, and food resources. During migration, it may ascend in a thermal and then glide down, or may ascend in updrafts created by the wind against a cliff or other terrain. Migration generally takes place during the daytime, usually between the local hours of 8:00 a.m. and 6:00 p.m., when thermals are produced by the sun.

H. l. washingtoniensis mobbed by crows

== Diet and feeding ==
The bald eagle is an opportunistic carnivore with the capacity to consume a great variety of prey. Fish comprise most of the eagle's diet throughout their range. In 20 food habit studies across the species' range, fish comprised 56% of the diet of nesting eagles, birds 28%, mammals 14% and other prey 2%. More than 400 species are in the bald eagle's prey spectrum, far more than its ecological equivalent in the Old World, the white-tailed eagle, is known to take. Despite its considerably lower population, the bald eagle may come in second amongst all North American accipitrids, slightly behind the red-tailed hawk in its number of prey species.

=== Behavior ===
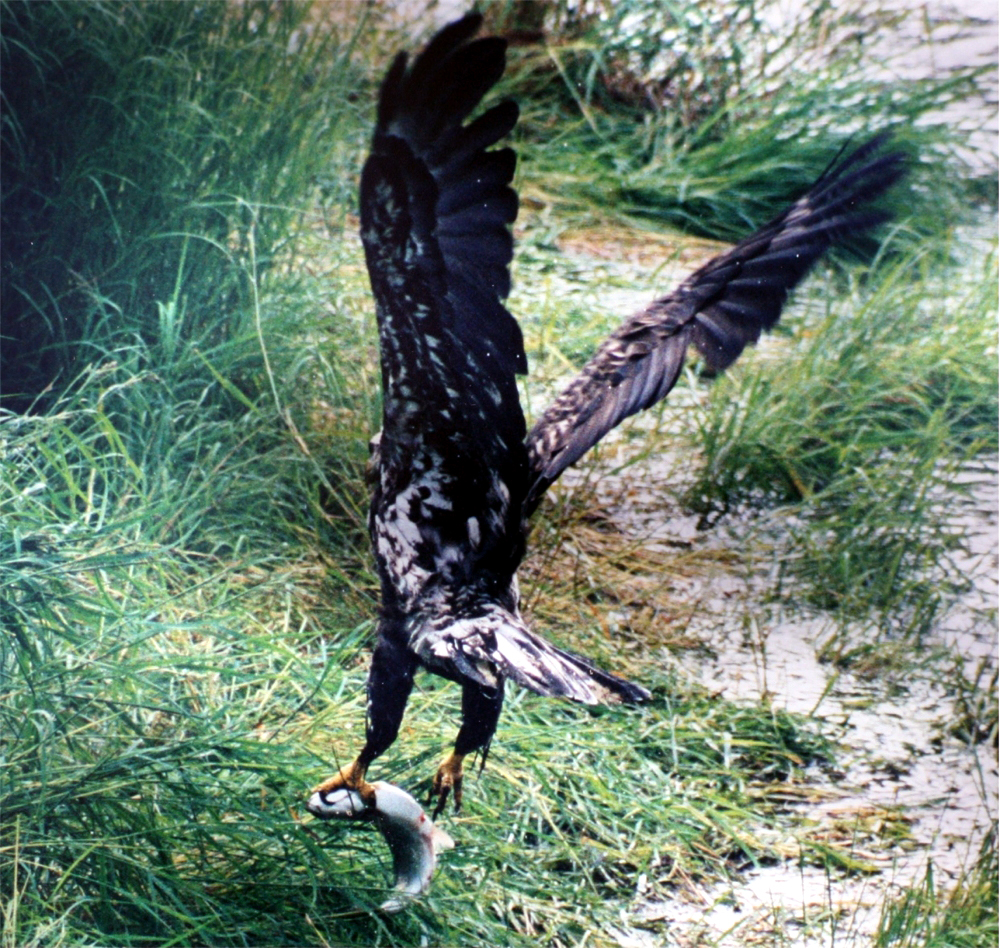
Juvenile with salmon, Katmai National Park

To hunt fish, the eagle swoops down over the water and snatches the fish out of the water with its talons. They eat by holding the fish in one claw and tearing the flesh with the other. Eagles have structures on their toes called spicules that allow them to grasp fish. Ospreys also have this adaptation. Bird prey may occasionally be attacked in flight, with prey up to the size of Canada geese attacked and killed in mid-air. It has been estimated that the bald eagle's grip (measured as newtons per square meter, or pounds per square inch) is ten times stronger than that of a human. Bald eagles can fly with fish at least equal to their own weight, but if the fish is too heavy to lift, the eagle may be dragged into the water. Bald eagles can swim, but in some cases, they drag their catch ashore with their talons. Still, some eagles drown or succumb to hypothermia. Many sources claim that bald eagles, like all large eagles, cannot normally take flight carrying prey more than half of their own weight unless aided by favorable wind conditions. On numerous occasions, when large prey such as large fish including mature salmon or geese are attacked, eagles have been seen to make contact and then drag the prey in a strenuously labored, low flight over the water to a bank, where they then finish off and dismember the prey. When food is abundant, an eagle can gorge itself by storing up to 1 kg (2.2 lb) of food in a pouch in the throat called a crop. Gorging allows the bird to fast for several days if food becomes unavailable. Occasionally, bald eagles may hunt cooperatively when confronting prey, especially relatively large prey such as jackrabbits or herons, with one bird distracting potential prey, while the other comes behind it in order to ambush it. While hunting waterfowl, bald eagles repeatedly fly at a target and cause it to dive repeatedly, hoping to exhaust the victim so it can be caught (white-tailed eagles have been recorded hunting waterfowl in the same way). When hunting concentrated prey, a successful catch often results in the hunting eagle being pursued by other eagles and needing to find an isolated perch for consumption if it is able to carry it away successfully.

They obtain much of their food as carrion or via a practice known as kleptoparasitism, by which they steal prey away from other predators. Due to their dietary habits, bald eagles are frequently viewed in a negative light by humans. Thanks to their superior foraging ability and experience, adults are generally more likely to hunt live prey than immature eagles, which often obtain their food from scavenging. They are not very selective about the condition or origin, whether provided by humans, other animals, auto accidents or natural causes, of a carcass's presence, but will avoid eating carrion where disturbances from humans are a regular occurrence. They will scavenge carcasses up to the size of whales, though carcasses of ungulates and large fish are seemingly preferred. Congregated wintering waterfowl are frequently exploited for carcasses to scavenge by immature eagles in harsh winter weather. Bald eagles also may feed on material scavenged or stolen from campsites and picnics, as well as garbage dumps (dump usage is habitual mainly in Alaska) and fish-processing plants.

=== Fish ===
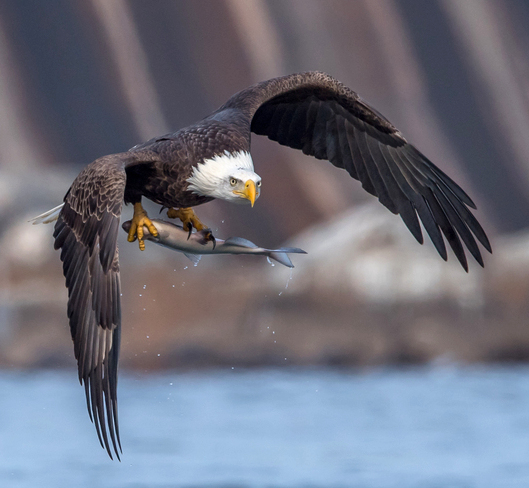
In flight with freshly caught fish

Feeding on catfish and other various fishes. Painted by John James Audubon.

In Southeast Alaska, fish comprise approximately 66% of the year-round diet of bald eagles and 78% of the prey brought to the nest by the parents. Eagles living in the Columbia River Estuary in Oregon were found to rely on fish for 90% of their dietary intake. At least 100 species of fish have been recorded in the bald eagle's diet. From observation in the Columbia River, 58% of the fish were caught alive by the eagle, 24% were scavenged as carcasses and 18% were pirated away from other animals.

In the Pacific Northwest, spawning trout and salmon provide most of the bald eagles' diet from late summer throughout fall. Though bald eagles occasionally catch live salmon, they usually scavenge spawned salmon carcass. Southeast Alaskan eagles largely prey on pink salmon (Oncorhynchus gorbuscha), coho salmon (O. kisutch) and, more locally, sockeye salmon (O. nerka), with Chinook salmon (O. tshawytscha). Due to the Chinook salmon's large size (12 to 18 kg (26 to 40 lb) average adult size), it is probably taken only as carrion and a single carcass can attract several eagles. Also important in the estuaries and shallow coastlines of southern Alaska are Pacific herring (Clupea pallasii), Pacific sand lance (Ammodytes hexapterus) and eulachon (Thaleichthys pacificus). In Oregon's Columbia River Estuary, the most significant prey species were largescale suckers (Catostomus macrocheilus) (17.3% of the prey selected there), American shad (Alosa sapidissima; 13%) and common carp (Cyprinus carpio; 10.8%). Eagles living at Chesapeake Bay in Maryland were found to subsist largely on American gizzard shad (Dorosoma cepedianum), threadfin shad (Dorosoma petenense) and white bass (Morone chrysops). Floridian eagles have been reported to prey on catfish, most prevalently the brown bullhead (Ameiurus nebulosus) and any species in the genus Ictalurus as well as mullet, trout, needlefish, and eels. Chain pickerels (Esox niger) and white suckers (Catostomus commersonii) are frequently taken in interior Maine. Wintering eagles on the Platte River in Nebraska preyed mainly on American gizzard shads and common carp. Bald eagles are also known to eat the following fish species: rainbow trout (Oncorhynchus mykiss), white catfish (Ameiurus catus), rock greenling (Hexagrammos lagocephalus), Pacific cod (Gadus macrocephalus), Atka mackerel (Pleurogrammus monopterygius), largemouth bass (Micropterus salmoides), northern pike (Esox lucius), striped bass (Morone saxatilis), dogfish shark (Squalidae.sp) and blue walleye (Sander vitreus).

Fish taken by bald eagles varies in size, but bald eagles take larger fish than other piscivorous birds in North America, typically range from 20 to 75 cm (7.9 to 29.5 in) and prefer 36 cm (14 in) fish. When experimenters offered fish of different sizes in the breeding season around Lake Britton in California, fish measuring 34 to 38 cm (13 to 15 in) were taken 71.8% of the time by parent eagles while fish measuring 23 to 27.5 cm (9.1 to 10.8 in) were chosen only 25% of the time. At nests around Lake Superior, the remains of fish (mostly suckers) were found to average 35.4 cm (13.9 in) in total length. In the Columbia River Estuary, most preyed on by eagles were estimated to measure less than 30 cm (12 in), but larger fish between 30 and 60 cm (12 and 24 in) or even exceeding 60 cm (24 in) in length also taken especially during the non-breeding seasons. They can take fish up to at least twice their own weight, such as large mature salmons, carps, or even muskellunge (Esox masquinongy), by dragging its catch with talons and pull toward ashore. Much larger marine fish such as Pacific halibut (Hippoglossus stenolepis) and lemon sharks (Negaprion brevirostris) have been recorded among bald eagle prey though probably are only taken as young, as small, newly mature fish, or as carrion.

Benthic fishes such as catfish are usually consumed after they die and float to the surface, though while temporarily swimming in the open may be more vulnerable to predation than most fish since their eyes focus downwards. Bald eagles also regularly exploit water turbines which produce battered, stunned or dead fish easily consumed. Predators who leave behind scraps of dead fish that they kill, such as brown bears (Ursus arctos), gray wolves (Canis lupus) and Red foxes (Vulpes vulpes), may be habitually followed in order to scavenge the kills secondarily. Once North Pacific salmon die off after spawning, usually local bald eagles eat salmon carcasses almost exclusively. Eagles in Washington need to consume 489 g (1.078 lb) of fish each day for survival, with adults generally consuming more than juveniles and thus reducing potential energy deficiency and increasing survival during winter.

=== Birds ===
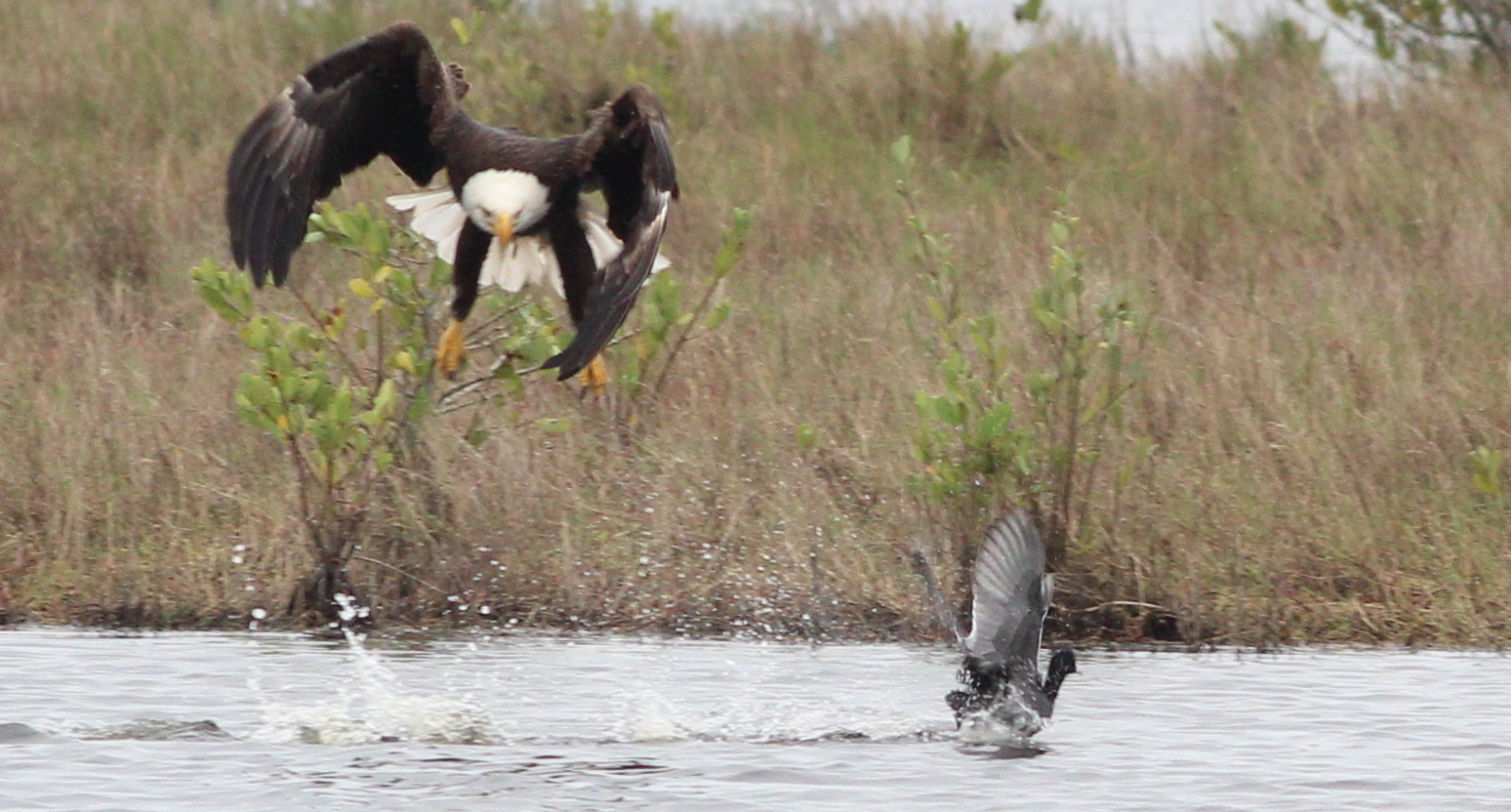
Bald eagle attacking an American coot

Behind fish, the next most significant prey base for bald eagles are other waterbirds. The contribution of such birds to the eagle's diet is variable, depending on the quantity and availability of fish near the water's surface. Waterbirds can seasonally comprise from 7% to 80% of the prey selection for eagles in certain localities. Overall, birds are the most diverse group in the bald eagle's prey spectrum, with 200 prey species recorded.

Bird species most preferred as prey by eagles tend to be medium-sized, such as western grebes (Aechmophorus occidentalis), mallards (Anas platyrhynchos), and American coots (Fulica americana) as such prey is relatively easy for the much larger eagles to catch and fly with. American herring gull (Larus smithsonianus) are the favored avian prey species for eagles living around Lake Superior. Black ducks (Anas rubripes), common eiders (Somateria mollissima), and double-crested cormorants (Phalacrocorax auritus) are also frequently taken in coastal Maine and velvet scoter (Melanitta fusca) was dominant prey in San Miguel Island.

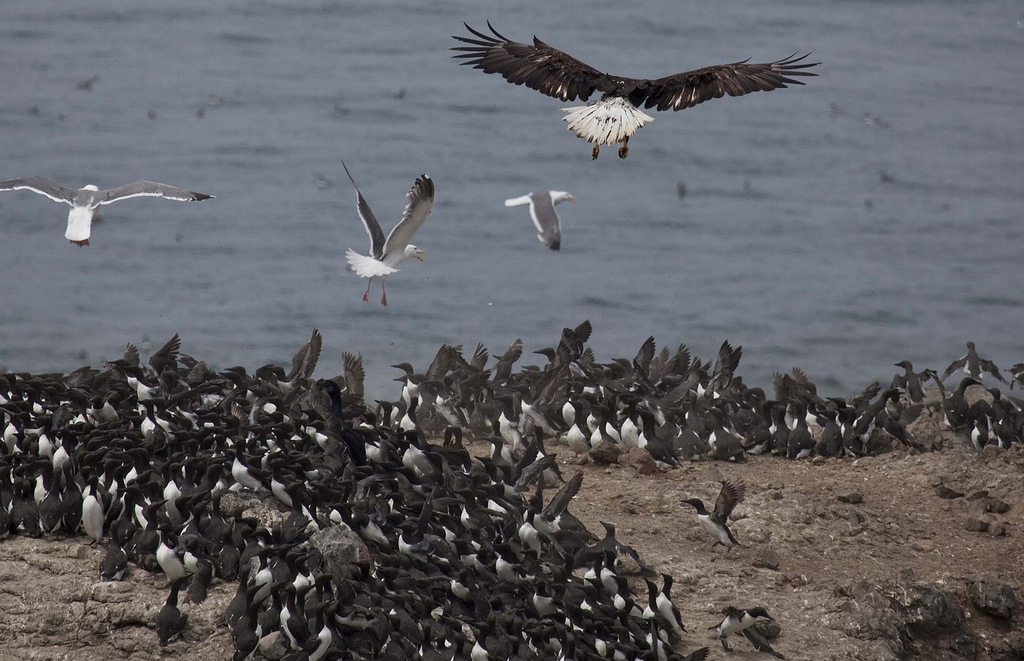
A bald eagle prepares to pick off a common murre from Colony Rock in Oregon Islands National Wildlife Refuge, Oregon, United States.

Due to easy accessibility and lack of formidable nest defense against eagles by such species, bald eagles are capable of preying on such seabirds at all ages, from eggs to mature adults, and they can effectively cull large portions of a colony. Along some portions of the North Pacific coastline, bald eagles which had historically preyed mainly kelp-dwelling fish and supplementally sea otter (Enhydra lutris) pups are now preying mainly on seabird colonies since both the fish (possibly due to overfishing) and otters (cause unknown) have had steep population declines, causing concern for seabird conservation. Because of this more extensive predation, some biologist has expressed concern that murres are heading for a "conservation collision" due to heavy eagle predation. Eagles have been confirmed to attack nocturnally active, burrow-nesting seabird species such as storm petrels and shearwaters by digging out their burrows and feeding on all animals they find inside. If a bald eagle flies close by, waterbirds will often fly away en masse, though they may seemingly ignore a perched eagle in other cases. When the birds fly away from a colony, this exposes their unprotected eggs and nestlings to scavengers such as gulls.

While they usually target small to medium-sized seabirds, larger seabirds such as great black-backed gulls (Larus marinus) and northern gannets (Morus bassanus) and brown pelicans (Pelecanus occidentalis) of all ages can successfully be taken by bald eagles. Similarly, large waterbirds are occasionally killed. Geese such as wintering emperor geese (Chen canagica) and snow geese (C. caerulescens), which gather in large groups, sometimes becoming regular prey. Smaller Ross's geese (Anser rossii) are also taken, as well as large-sized Canada geese (Branta canadensis). Predation on the largest subspecies (Branta canadensis maxima) has been reported. Other large waterbird prey include common loons (Gavia immer) of all ages. Large wading birds can also fall prey to bald eagles. For the great blue herons (Ardea herodias), bald eagles are their only serious enemies of all ages. Slightly larger Sandhill cranes (Grus canadensis) can be taken as well. While adult whooping cranes (Grus americana) are too large and formidable, their chicks can fall prey to bald eagles. They even occasionally prey on adult tundra swans (Cygnus columbianus). Young trumpeter swans (Cygnus buccinator) are also taken, and an unsuccessful attack on an adult swan has been photographed.

Bald eagles have been occasionally recorded as killing other raptors. In some cases, these may be attacks of competition or kleptoparasitism on rival species but end with the consumption of the dead victims. Nine species of other accipitrids and owls are known to have been preyed upon by bald eagles. Owl prey species have ranged in size from western screech owls (Megascops kennicotti) to snowy owls (Bubo scandiacus). Larger diurnal raptors known to have fallen victim to bald eagles have included red-tailed hawks (Buteo jamaicensis), peregrine falcons (Falco peregrinus), northern goshawks (Accipiter gentilis), ospreys (Pandion haliaetus) and black (Coragyps atratus) and turkey vultures (Cathartes aura).

=== Mammals ===
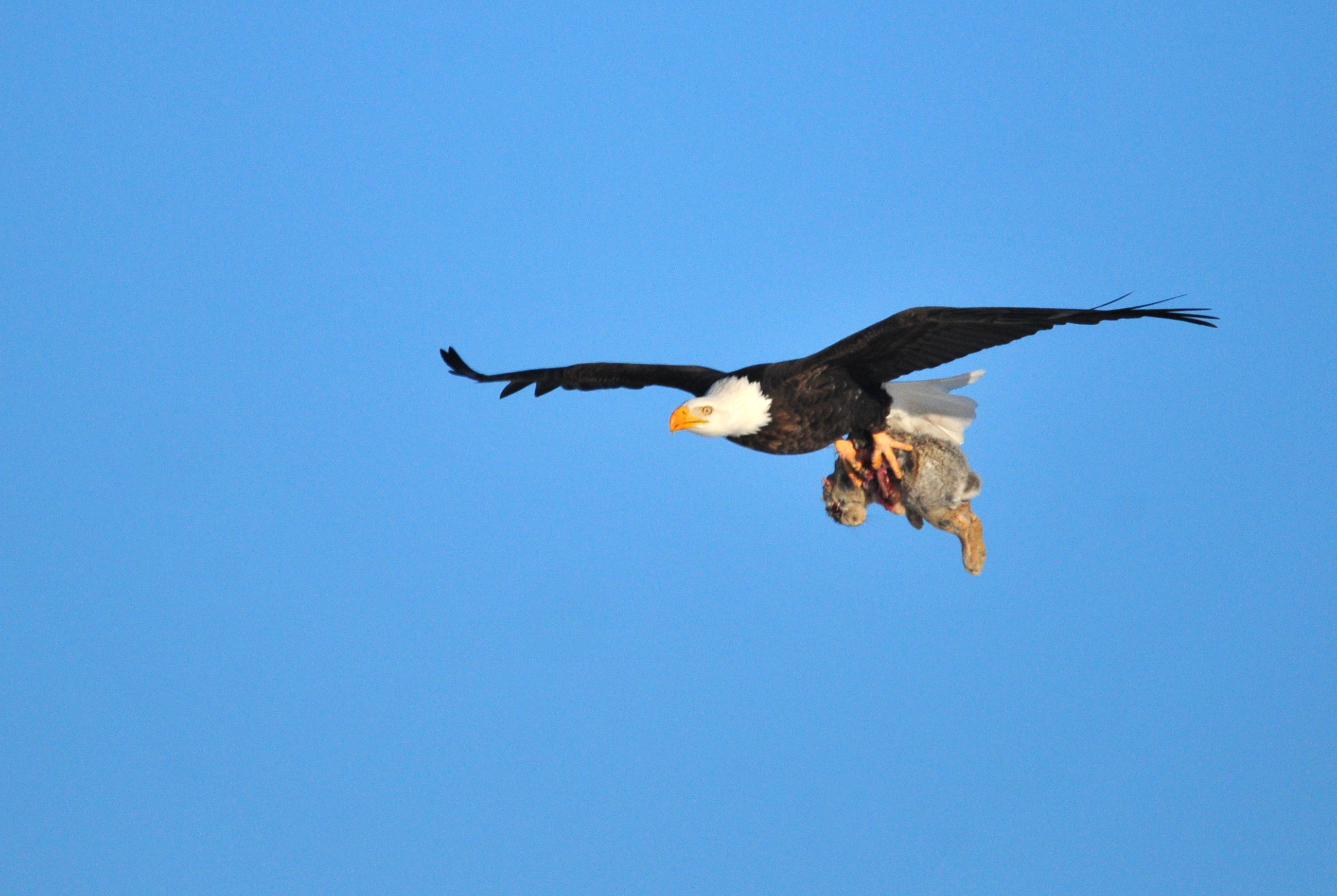
Carrying a caught cottontail rabbit in Seedskadee National Wildlife Refuge

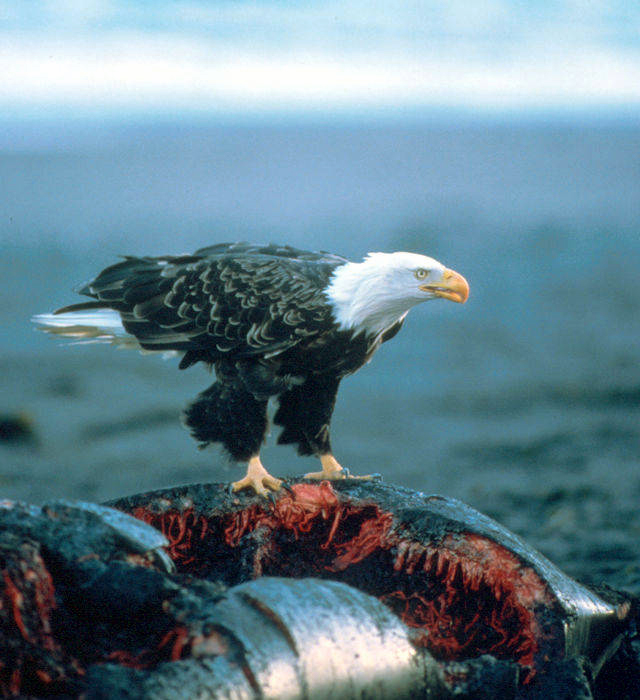
A bald eagle on a whale carcass

Mammalian preys are generally less frequently taken than fish or avian prey. However, in some regions, such as landlocked areas of North America, wintering bald eagles may become habitual predators of medium-sized mammals that occur in colonies or local concentrations, such as prairie dogs (Cynomys sp.) and jackrabbits (Lepus sp.). Bald eagles in Seedskadee National Wildlife Refuge often hunt in pair to catch cottontails, jackrabbits and prairie dogs. They can attack and prey on rabbits and hares of nearly any size, from marsh rabbits (Sylvilagus palustris) to black and white-tailed jackrabbits (Lepus californicus and L. townsendii), and Arctic hares (Lepus arcticus). In the San Luis Valley, white-tailed jackrabbits can be important prey. Additionally, rodents such as montane voles (Microtus montanus), brown rats (Rattus norvegicus), and various squirrels are taken as supplementary prey. Larger rodents such as muskrats (Ondatra zibethicus), young or small adult nutrias (Myocastor coypus) and groundhogs (Marmota monax) are also preyed upon. Even North American porcupines (Erethizon dorsatum) are reportedly attacked and killed.

Where available, seal colonies can provide a lot of food. On Protection Island, Washington, they commonly feed on harbor seal (Phoca vitulina) afterbirths, still-borns and sickly seal pups. Similarly, bald eagles in Alaska readily prey on sea otter (Enhydra lutris) pups. Small to medium-sized terrestrial mammalian carnivores can be taken infrequently. Mustelid including American martens (Martes pennanti), American minks (Neogale vison), and larger fisher cats (Pekania pennanti) are known to be hunted. Foxes are also taken, including island foxes ( Urocyon littoralis ), Arctic foxes (Vulpes lagopus), and grey foxes (Urocyon cinereoargenteus). Although fox farmers claimed that bald eagle heavily prey on young and adult free-range Arctic fox, the predation events are sporadic. In one instance, two bald eagles fed upon a red fox (Vulpes vulpes) that had tried to cross a frozen Delaware Lake in Ohio. Other medium-sized carnivorans such as striped skunks (Mephitis mephitis), American hog-nosed skunks (Conepatus leuconotus), and common raccoons (Procyon lotor) are taken, as well as domestic cats (Felis catus) and dogs (Canis familiaris).

Other wild mammalian prey include fawns of deer such as white-tailed deer (Odocoileus virginianus) and Sitka deer (Odocoileus hemionus sitkensis), which weigh around 3 kg (6.6 lb) can be taken alive by bald eagles. In one instance, a bald eagle was observed carrying 6.8 kg (15 lb) mule deer (Odocoileus hemionus) fawn. Additionally, Virginia opossums (Didelphis virginiana) can be preyed upon. Still, predation events are rare due to their nocturnal habits.

Together with the golden eagle, bald eagles are occasionally accused of preying on livestock, especially sheep (Ovis aries). There are a handful of proven cases of lamb predation, some specimens weighing up to 11 kg (24 lb), by bald eagles. Still, they are much less likely to attack a healthy lamb than a golden eagle. Both species prefer native, wild prey and are unlikely to cause any extensive detriment to human livelihoods. There is one case of a bald eagle killing and feeding on an adult, pregnant ewe (then joined in eating the kill by at least three other eagles), which, weighing on average over 60 kg (130 lb), is much larger than any other known prey taken by this species.

=== Reptiles and other prey ===
Supplemental prey is readily taken given the opportunity. In some areas, reptiles may become regular prey, especially in warm areas such as Florida where reptile diversity is high. Turtles are perhaps the most regularly hunted type of reptile. In coastal New Jersey, 14 of 20 studied eagle nests included remains of turtles. The main species found were common musk turtles (Sternotherus odoratus), diamondback terrapin (Malaclemys terrapin) and juvenile common snapping turtles (Chelydra serpentina). In these New Jersey nests, mainly subadult and small adults were taken, ranging in carapace length from 9.2 to 17.1 cm (3.6 to 6.7 in). Similarly, many turtles were recorded in the diet in the Chesapeake Bay. In Texas, softshell turtles are the most frequently taken prey, and a large number of Barbour's map turtles are taken in Torreya State Park. Other reptilian and amphibian prey includes southern alligator lizards (Elgaria multicarinata), snakes such as garter snakes and rattlesnakes, and Greater siren (Siren lacertina).

Invertebrates are occasionally taken. In Alaska, eagles feed on sea urchins (Strongylocentrotus sp.), chitons, mussels, and crabs. Other various mollusks such as land snails, abalones, bivalves, periwinkles, blue mussels, squids, and starfishes are taken as well.

=== Interspecific predatory relationships ===
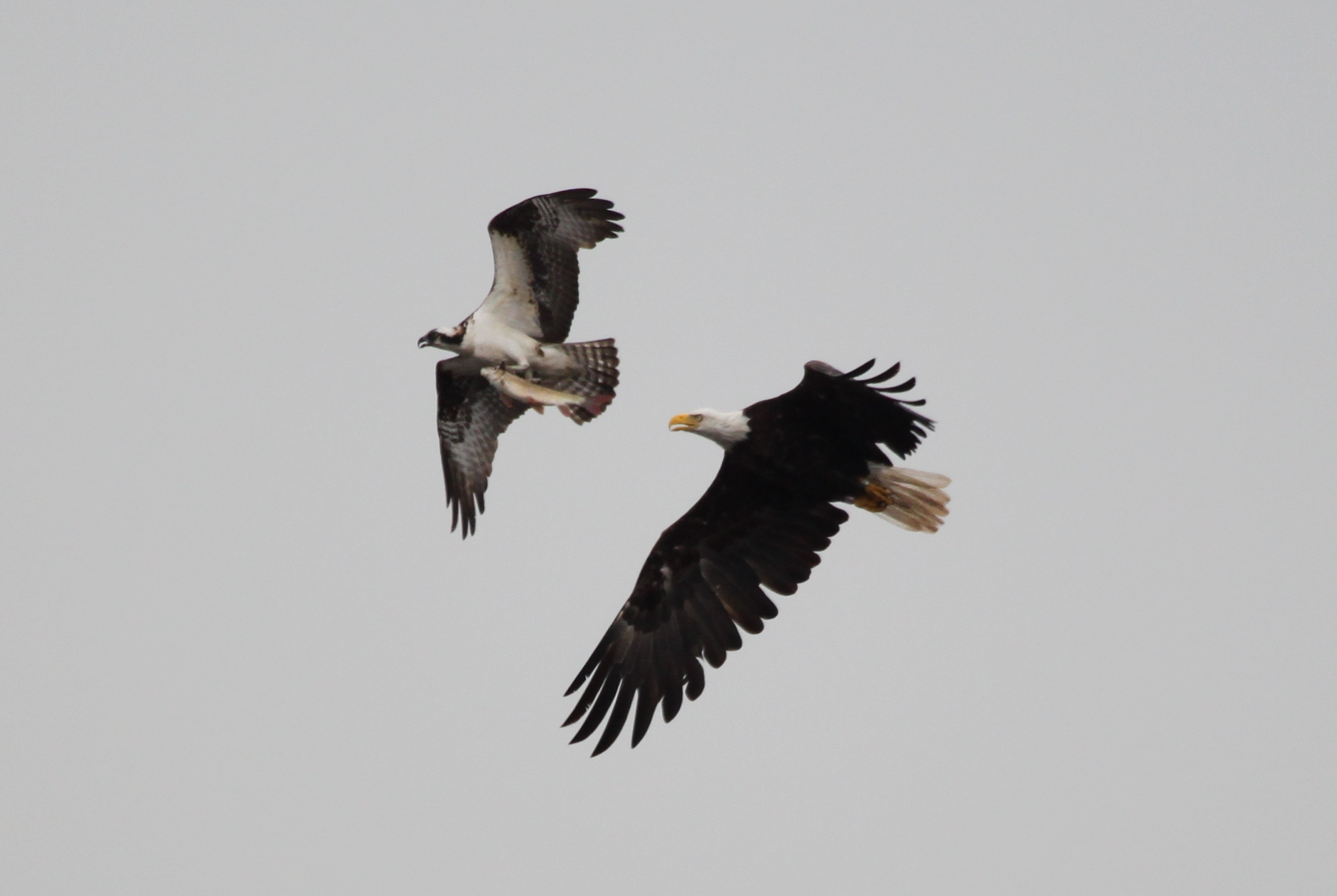
Pursuing an osprey to steal fish

When competing for food, eagles will usually dominate other fish-eaters and scavengers, aggressively displacing mammals such as coyotes (Canis latrans) and foxes, and birds such as corvids, gulls, vultures and other raptors. Occasionally, coyotes, bobcats (Lynx rufus) and domestic dogs (Canis familiaris) can displace eagles from carrion, usually less confident immature birds, as has been recorded in Maine. Bald eagles are less active, bold predators than golden eagles and get relatively more of their food as carrion and from kleptoparasitism (although it is now generally thought that golden eagles eat more carrion than was previously assumed). However, the two species are roughly equal in size, aggressiveness and physical strength and so competitions can go either way. Neither species is known to be dominant, and the outcome depends on the size and disposition of the individual eagles involved. Wintering bald and golden eagles in Utah both sometimes won conflicts, though in one recorded instance a single bald eagle successfully displaced two consecutive golden eagles from a kill.

Though bald eagles face few natural threats, an unusual attacker comes in the form of the common loon (G. immer), which is also taken by eagles as prey. While common loons normally avoid conflict, they are highly territorial and will attack predators and competitors by stabbing at them with their knife-like bill; as the range of the bald eagle has increased following conservation efforts, these interactions have been observed on several occasions, including a fatality of a bald eagle in Maine that is presumed to have come about as a result of it attacking a nest, then having a fatal puncture wound inflicted by one or both loon parents.

The bald eagle is thought to be much more numerous in North America than the golden eagle, with the bald species estimated to number at least 150,000 individuals, about twice as many as there are golden eagles estimated to live in North America. Due to this, bald eagles often outnumber golden eagles at attractive food sources. Despite the potential for contention between these animals, in New Jersey during winter, a golden eagle and numerous bald eagles were observed to hunt snow geese alongside each other without conflict. Similarly, both eagle species have been recorded, via video-monitoring, to feed on gut piles and carcasses of white-tailed deer (Odocoileus virginianus) in remote forest clearings in the eastern Appalachian Mountains without apparent conflict. Bald eagles are frequently mobbed by smaller raptors, due to their infrequent but unpredictable tendency to hunt other birds of prey. Many bald eagles are habitual kleptoparasites, especially in winters when fish are harder to come by. They have been recorded stealing fish from other predators such as ospreys, herons and even otters. They have also been recorded opportunistically pirating birds from peregrine falcons (Falco peregrinus), prairie dogs from ferruginous hawks (Buteo regalis) and even jackrabbits from golden eagles. When they approach scavengers such as dogs, gulls or vultures at carrion sites, they often attack them in an attempt to force them to disgorge their food. Healthy adult bald eagles are not preyed upon in the wild and are thus considered apex predators.

== Reproduction ==
Bald eagles are sexually mature at four or five years of age. When they are old enough to breed, they often return to the area where they were born. Bald eagles have high mate fidelity and generally mate for life. However, if one pair member dies or disappears, the survivor will choose a new mate. A pair that has repeatedly failed in breeding attempts may split and look for new mates. Bald eagle courtship involves elaborate, spectacular calls and flight displays by the males.

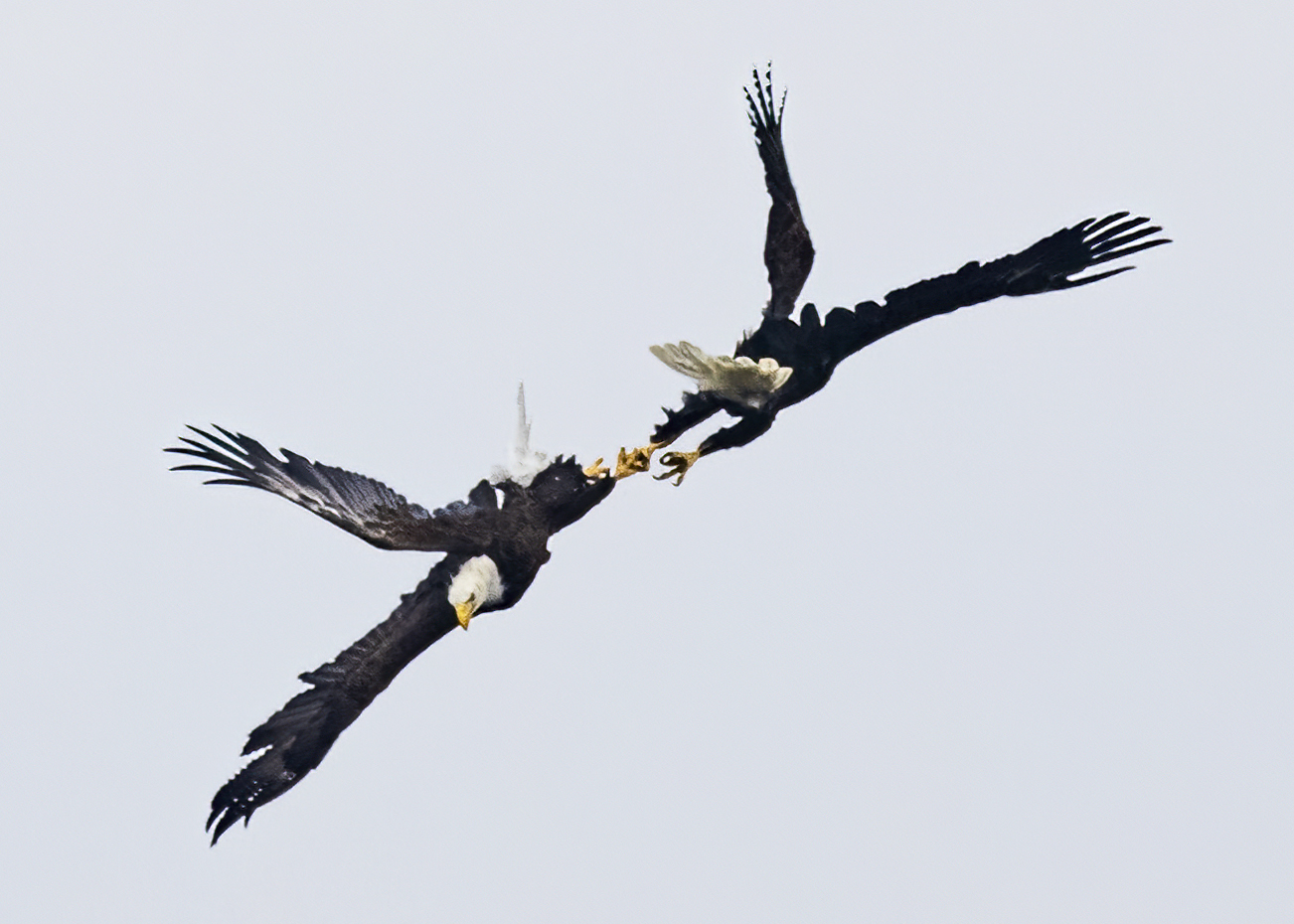
Bald eagles with talons locked together in a mating dance spiral free-fall dive

The flight includes swoops, chases, and cartwheels, in which they fly high, lock talons, and free-fall, separating just before hitting the ground. Usually, a territory defended by a mature pair will be 1 to 2 km (0.62 to 1.24 mi) of waterside habitat.

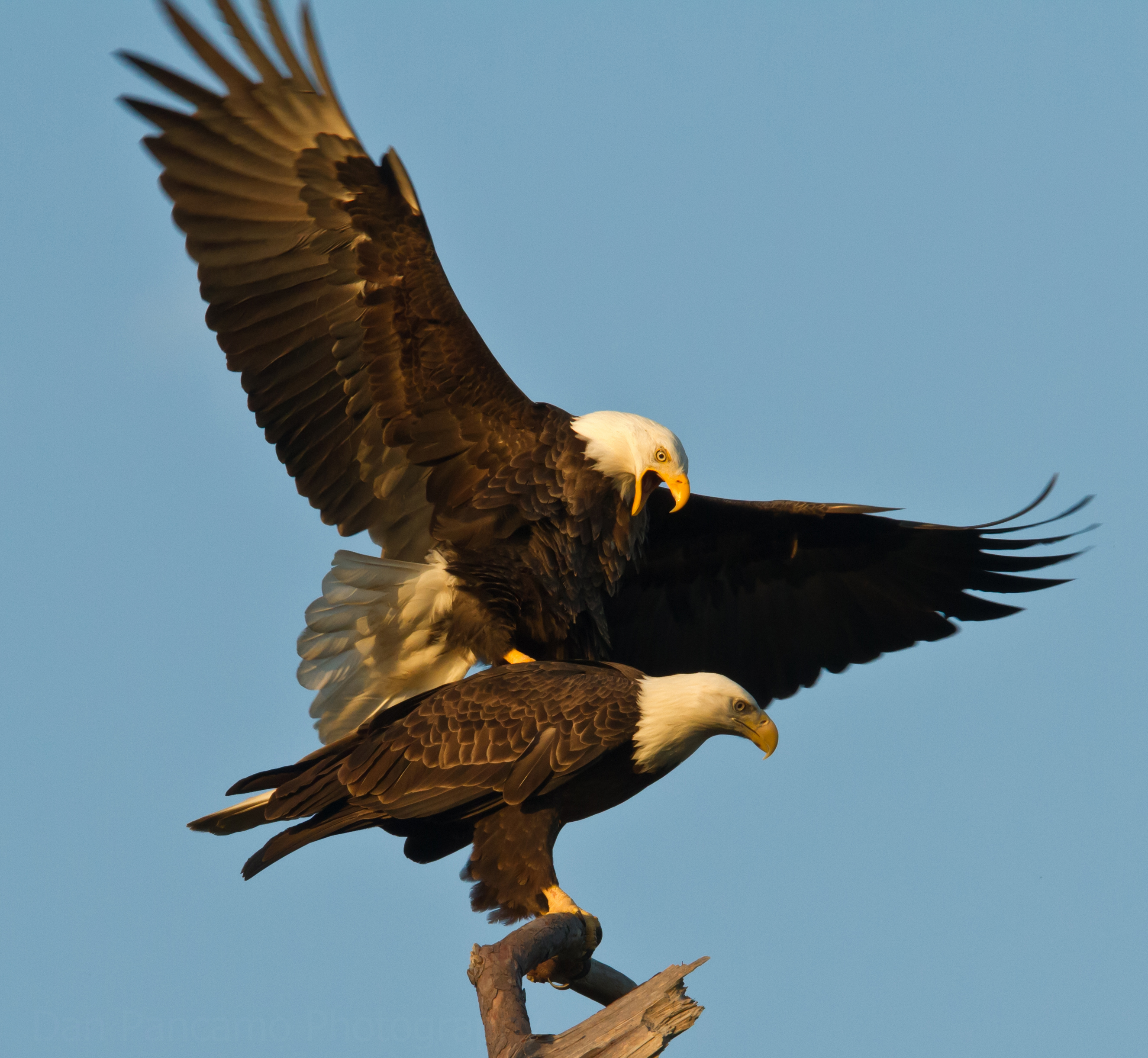
Mating

Compared to most other raptors, which mostly nest in April or May, bald eagles are early breeders: nest building or reinforcing is often by mid-February, egg laying is often late February (sometimes during deep snow in the North), and incubation is usually mid-March and early May. Eggs hatch from mid-April to early May, and the young fledge from late June to early July. The nest is the largest of any bird in North America; it is used repeatedly over many years and with new material added each year may eventually be as large as 4 m (13 ft) deep, 2.5 m (8.2 ft) across and weigh 1 metric ton (1.1 short tons). One nest in Florida was found to be 6.1 m (20 ft) deep, 2.9 meters (9.5 ft) across, and to weigh 3 short tons (2.7 metric tons). This nest is on record as the largest tree nest ever recorded for any animal. Usually nests are used for under five years, as they either collapse in storms or break the branches supporting them by their sheer weight. However, one nest in the Midwest was occupied continuously for at least 34 years. The nest is built of branches, usually in large trees found near water. When breeding where there are no trees, the bald eagle will nest on the ground, as has been recorded largely in areas largely isolated from terrestrial predators, such as Amchitka Island in Alaska.

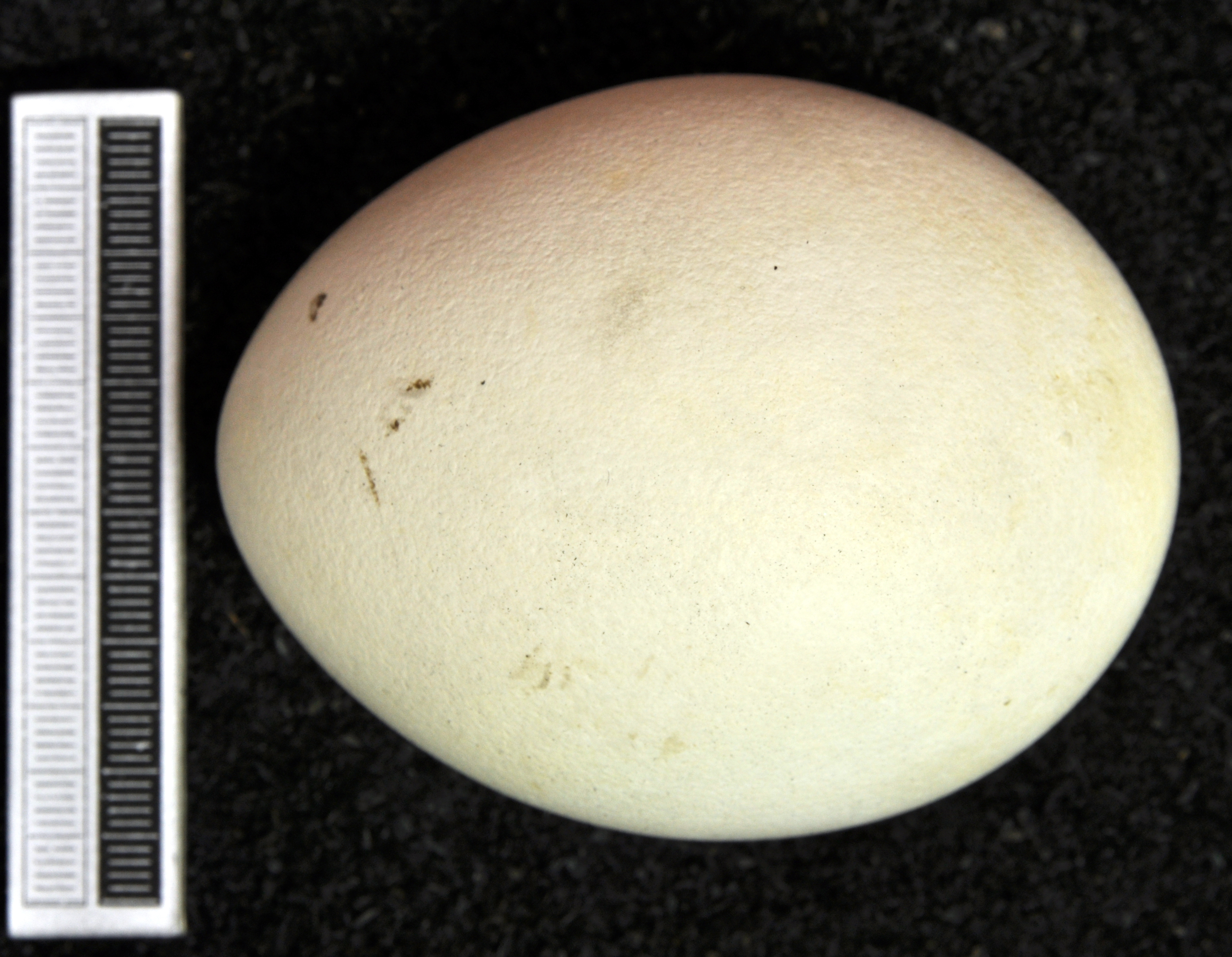
Bald eagle egg, Collection at Museum Wiesbaden in Germany

In Sonora, Mexico, eagles have been observed nesting on top of hecho cactuses (Pachycereus pectin-aboriginum). Nests located on cliffs and rock pinnacles have been reported historically in California, Kansas, Nevada, New Mexico and Utah, but currently are only verified to occur only in Alaska and Arizona. The eggs average about 73 mm (2.9 in) long, ranging from 58 to 85 mm (2.3 to 3.3 in), and have a breadth of 54 mm (2.1 in), ranging from 47 to 63 mm (1.9 to 2.5 in). Eggs in Alaska averaged 130 g (4.6 oz) in mass, while in Saskatchewan they averaged 114.4 g (4.04 oz). As with their ultimate body size, egg size tends to increase with distance from the equator. Eagles produce between one and three eggs per year, two being typical. Rarely, four eggs have been found in nests, but these may be exceptional cases of polygyny. Eagles in captivity have been capable of producing up to seven eggs. It is rare for all three chicks to successfully reach the fledgling stage. The oldest chick often bears the advantage of a larger size and louder voice, which tends to draw the parents' attention towards it. Occasionally, as is recorded in many large raptorial birds, the oldest sibling sometimes attacks and kills its younger sibling(s), especially early in the nesting period when their sizes are most different. However, nearly half of the known bald eagles produce two fledglings (more rarely three), unlike in some other "eagle" species such as some in the genus Aquila, in which a second fledgling is typically observed in less than 20% of nests, despite two eggs typically being laid. Both the male and female take turns incubating the eggs, but the female does most of the sitting. The parent not incubating will hunt for food or look for nesting material during this stage. For the first two to three weeks of the nestling period, at least one adult is at the nest almost 100% of the time. After five to six weeks, the attendance of parents usually drops off considerably (with the parents often perching in trees nearby).

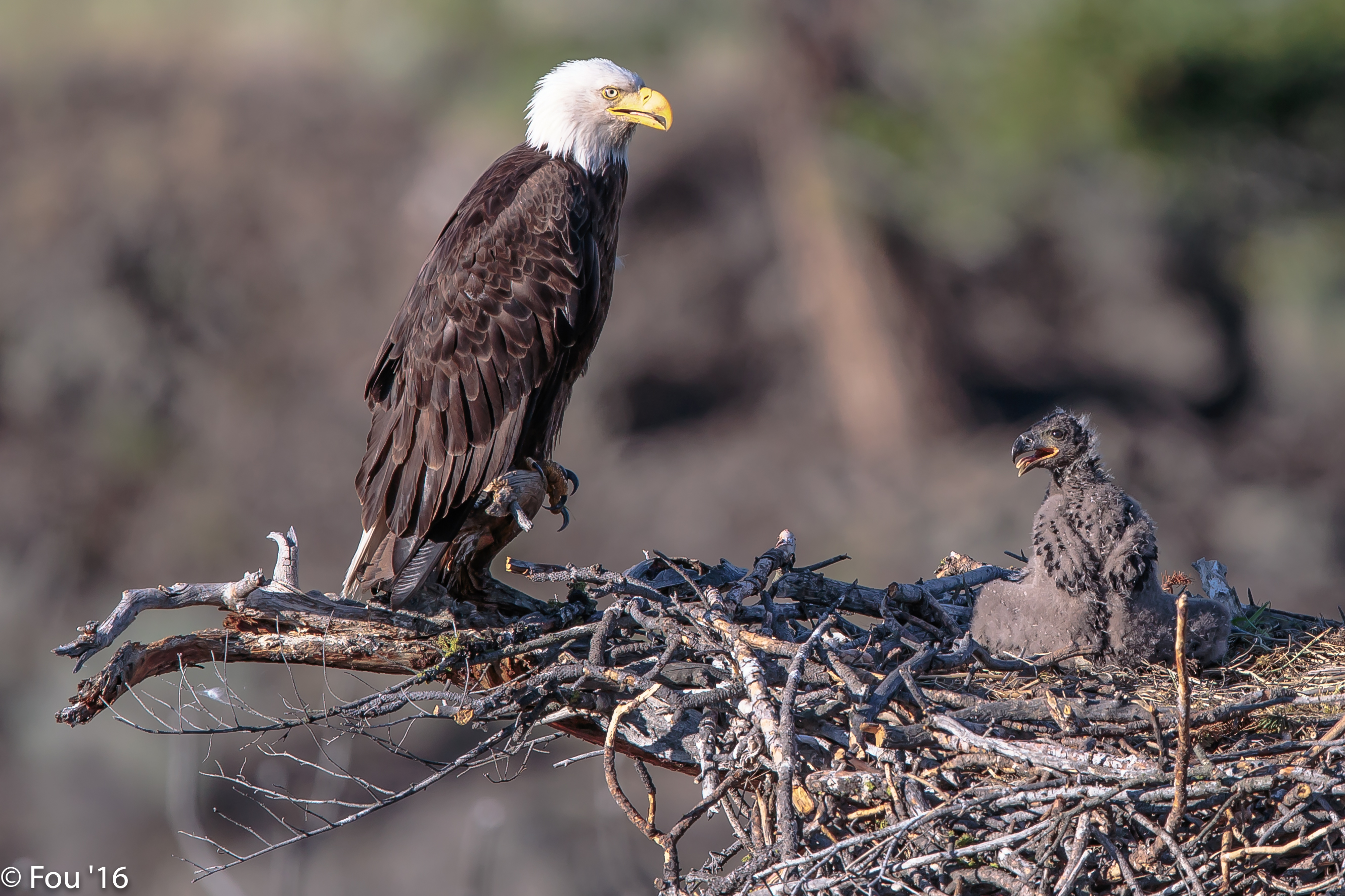
Adult and chick

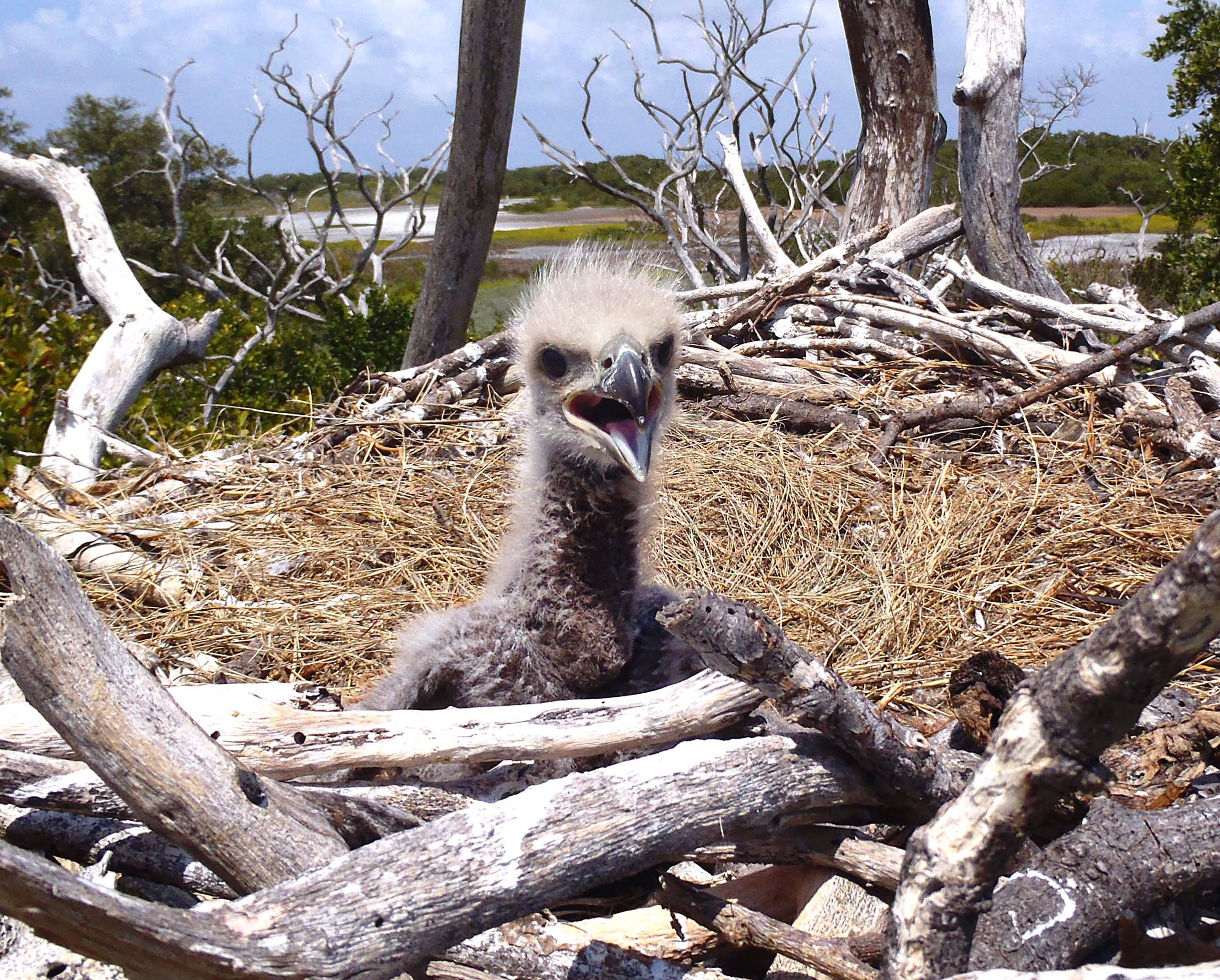
Chick at Everglades National Park

A young eaglet can gain up to 170 g (6.0 oz) a day, the fastest growth rate of any North American bird. The young eaglets pick up and manipulate sticks, play tug of war with each other, practice holding things in their talons, and stretch and flap their wings. By eight weeks, the eaglets are strong enough to flap their wings, lift their feet off the nest platform, and rise in the air. The young fledge at anywhere from 8 to 14 weeks of age, though will remain close to the nest and be attended to by their parents for a further six weeks. Juvenile eagles first start dispersing away from their parents about eight weeks after they fledge. Variability in departure date related to effects of sex and hatching order on growth and development. For the next four years, immature eagles wander widely in search of food until they attain adult plumage and are eligible to reproduce.

Male eagles have been observed killing and cannibalizing their chicks. In 2024, at the National Conservation Training Center (NCTC) in West Virginia, the NCTC's Eagle Cam recorded two bald eagle chicks being attacked and devoured by their father as soon as the mother departed from the nest. The NCTC noted in its statement on the incident that such behavior "has been observed in other nests and is not uncommon in birds of prey."

On rare occasions, bald eagles have been recorded to adopt other raptor fledglings into their nests, as seen in 2017 by a pair of eagles in Shoal Harbor Migratory Bird Sanctuary near Sidney, British Columbia. The pair of eagles in question are believed to have carried a juvenile red-tailed hawk back to their nest, presumably as prey, whereupon the chick was accepted into the family by both the parents and the eagles' three nestlings. The hawk, nicknamed "Spunky" by biologists monitoring the nest, fledged successfully.

== Longevity and mortality ==
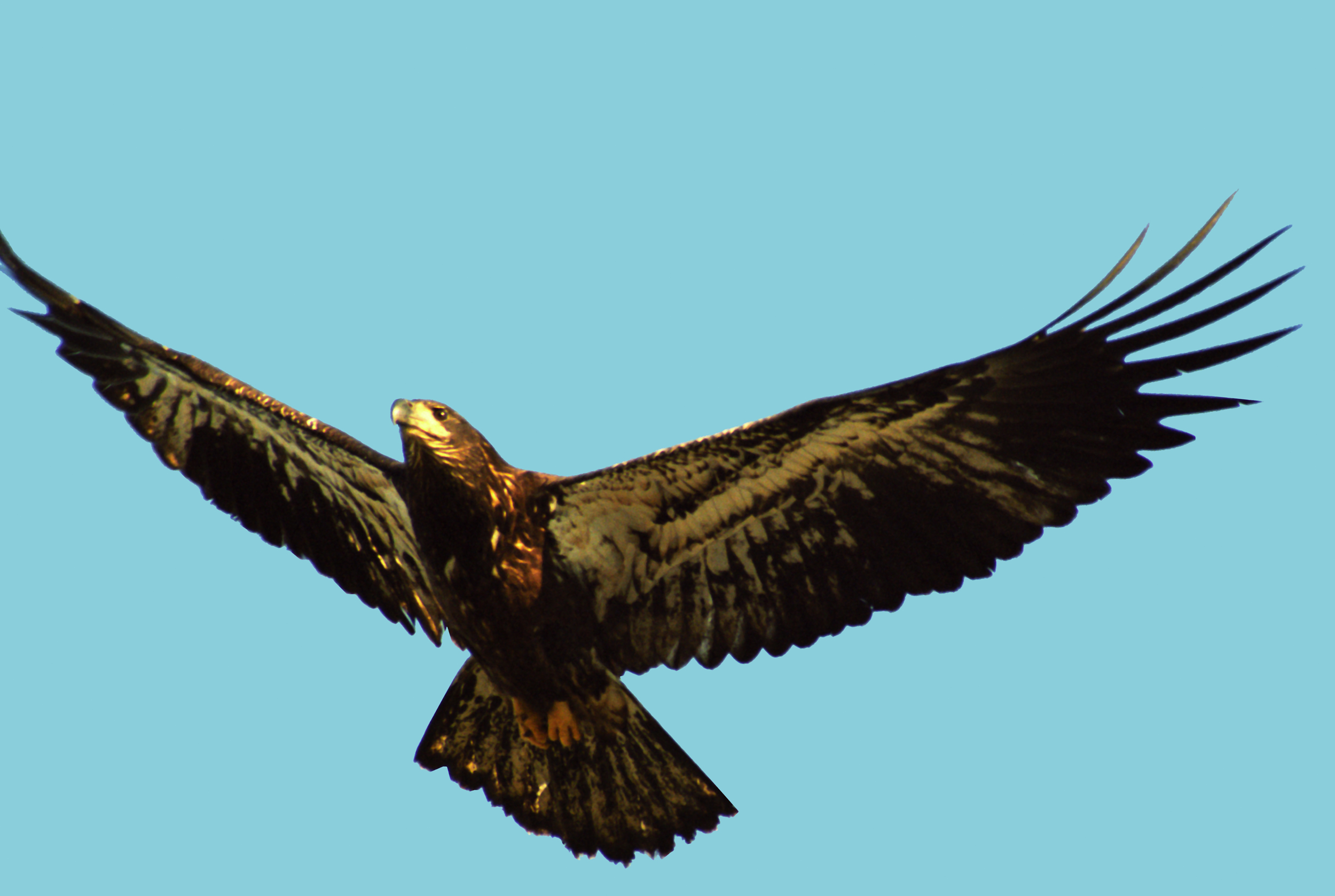
Newly fledged juvenile

The average lifespan of bald eagles in the wild is around 20 years, with the oldest confirmed one having been 38 years of age. In captivity, they often live somewhat longer. In one instance, a captive individual in New York lived for nearly 50 years. As with size, the average lifespan of an eagle population appears to be influenced by its location and access to prey. As they are no longer heavily persecuted, adult mortality is quite low. In one study of Florida eagles, adult bald eagles reportedly had 100% annual survival rate. In Prince William Sound, Alaska, adults had an annual survival rate of 88% even after the Exxon Valdez oil spill adversely affected eagles in the area. Of 1,428 individuals from across the range necropsied by the National Wildlife Health Center from 1963 to 1984, 329 (23%) eagles died from trauma, primarily impact with wires and vehicles; 309 (22%) died from gunshot; 158 (11%) died from poisoning; 130 (9%) died from electrocution; 68 (5%) died from trapping; 110 (8%) from emaciation; and 31 (2%) from disease; cause of death was undetermined in 293 (20%) of cases. In this study, 68% of mortality was human-caused. Recently, eagle-shooting is believed to be considerably reduced due to the species' protected status. A U.S. Fish and Wildlife Service study of 1,490 bald eagle deaths from 1986 through 2017 in Michigan found that 532 (36%) died due to being struck by cars while scavenging roadkill and 176 (12%) died due to lead poisoning from ingesting fragments of lead ammo and fishing gear present in carrion, with the proportion of both causes of death increasing significantly towards the end of the study period.

Most non-human-related mortality involves nestlings or eggs. Around 50% of eagles survive their first year. However, in the Chesapeake Bay area, 100% of 39 radio-tagged nestlings survived to their first year. Nestling or egg fatalities may be due to nest collapses, starvation, sibling aggression or inclement weather. Another significant cause of egg and nestling mortality is predation. Nest predators include large gulls, corvids (including ravens, crows and magpies), wolverines (Gulo gulo), fishers (Pekania pennanti), red-tailed hawks, owls, other eagles, bobcats, American black bears (Ursus americanus) and raccoons. If food access is low, parental attendance at the nest may be lower because both parents may have to forage, thus resulting in less protection. Nestlings are usually exempt from predation by terrestrial carnivores that are poor tree-climbers, but Arctic foxes (Vulpes lagopus) occasionally snatched nestlings from ground nests on Amchitka Island in Alaska before they were extirpated from the island. The bald eagle will defend its nest fiercely from all comers and has even repelled attacks from bears, having been recorded knocking a black bear out of a tree when the latter tried to climb a tree holding nestlings.

== Relationship with humans ==
=== Population decline and recovery ===
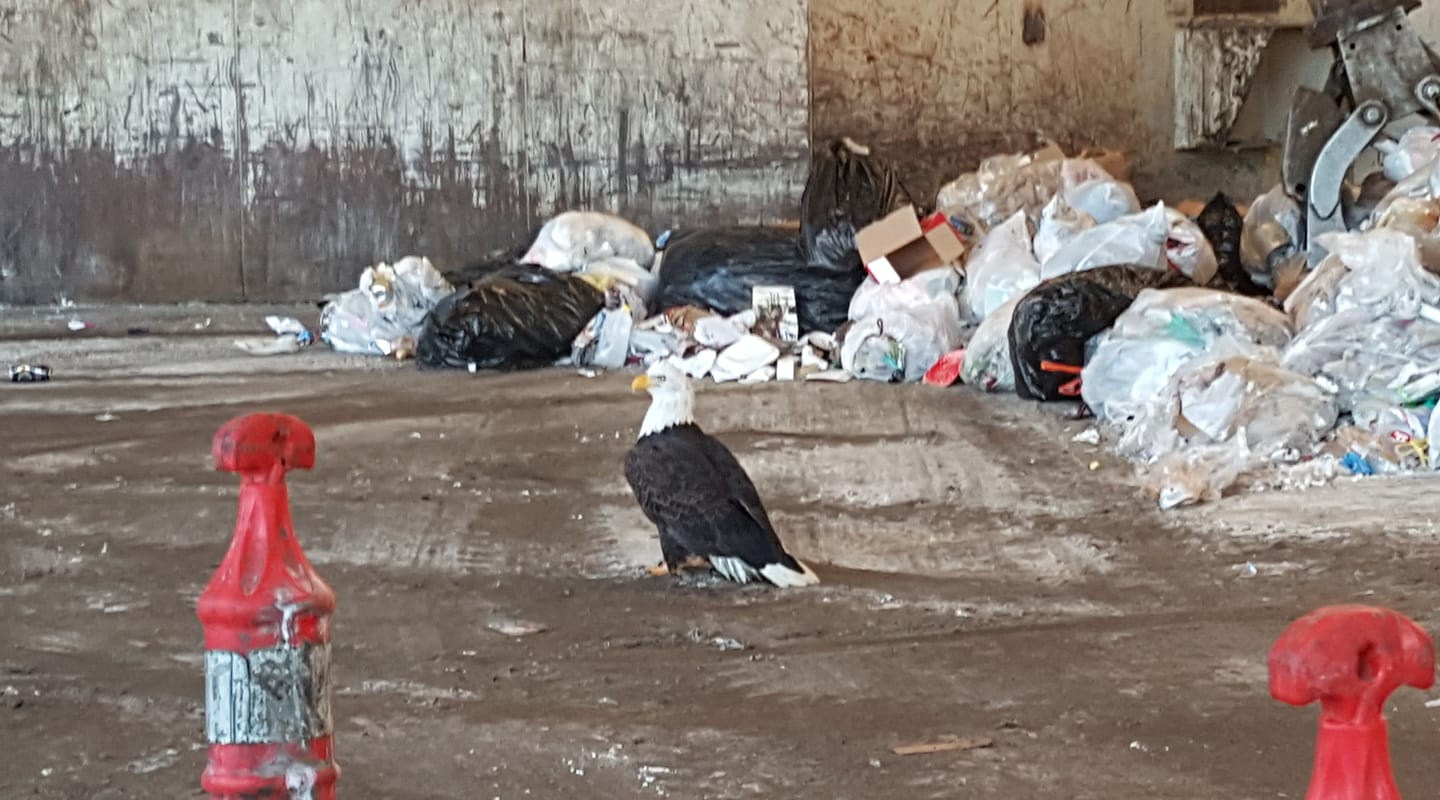
Inside a waste collection and transfer facility, in Homer, Alaska, United States

Once a common sight in much of the continent, the bald eagle was severely affected in the mid-20th century by a variety of factors, among them the thinning of egg shells attributed to use of the pesticide DDT. Bald eagles, like many birds of prey, were especially affected by DDT due to biomagnification. DDT itself was not lethal to the adult bird, but it interfered with their calcium metabolism, making them either sterile or unable to lay healthy eggs; many of their eggs were too brittle to withstand the weight of a brooding adult, making it nearly impossible for them to hatch. It is estimated that in the early 18th century the bald eagle population was 300,000–500,000, but by the 1950s there were only 412 nesting pairs in the 48 contiguous states of the U.S. Other factors in bald eagle population reductions were a widespread loss of suitable habitat, as well as both legal and illegal shooting. In 1930 a New York City ornithologist wrote that in the territory of Alaska in the previous 12 years, approximately 70,000 bald eagles had been shot. Many of the hunters killed the bald eagles under the long-held beliefs that bald eagles grabbed young lambs and even children with their talons, yet the birds were innocent of most of these alleged acts of predation (lamb predation is rare, human predation is thought to be non-existent). Illegal shooting was described as "the leading cause of direct mortality in both adult and immature bald eagles" by the U.S. Fish and Wildlife Service in 1978. Leading causes of death in bald eagles include lead pollution, poisoning, collision with motor vehicles, and power line electrocution. A study published in 2022 in the Journal Science found that more than half of adult eagles across 38 U.S. states suffered from lead poisoning. The primary cause is when eagles scavenge carcasses of animals shot by hunters. These are often tainted with lead shotgun pellets, rifle rounds, or fishing tackle.

The species was first protected in the U.S. and Canada by the 1918 Migratory Bird Treaty, later extended to all of North America. The Bald and Golden Eagle Protection Act, approved by the U.S. Congress in 1940, protected the bald eagle and the golden eagle, prohibiting commercial trapping and killing of the birds as well as collecting their eggs. The bald eagle was declared an endangered species in the U.S. in 1967, and amendments to the 1940 act between 1962 and 1972 further restricted commercial uses and increased penalties for violators. Perhaps most significant in the species' recovery, in 1972, DDT was banned from usage in the United States due to the fact that it inhibited the reproduction of many birds. DDT was completely banned in Canada in 1989, though its use had been highly restricted since the late 1970s.

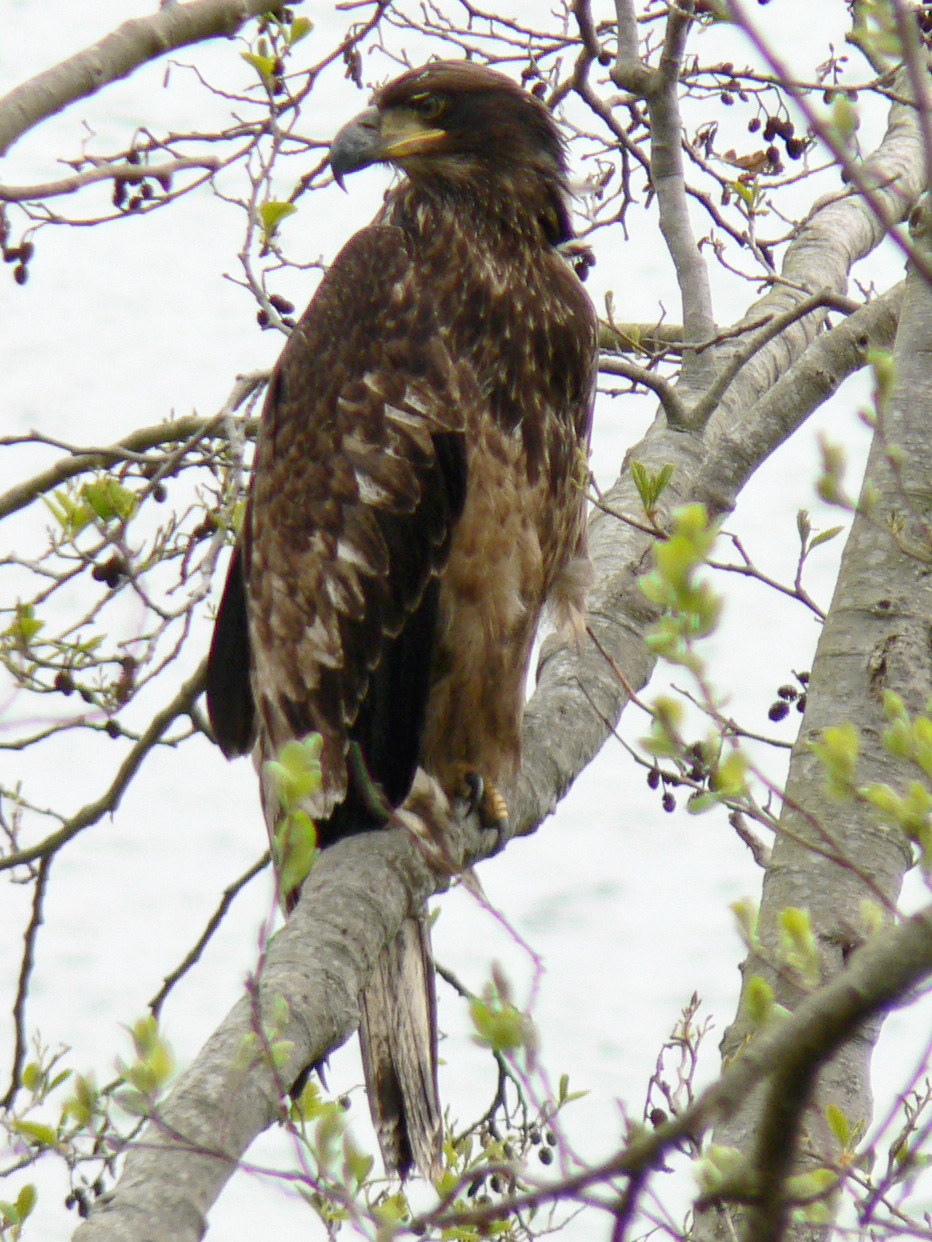
First-year juvenile bald eagle at Anacortes, Washington, United States

With regulations in place and DDT banned, the eagle population rebounded. The bald eagle can be found in growing concentrations throughout the United States and Canada, particularly near large bodies of water. In the early 1980s, the estimated total population was 100,000 individuals, with 110,000–115,000 by 1992; the U.S. state with the largest resident population is Alaska, with about 40,000–50,000, with the next highest population the Canadian province of British Columbia with 20,000–30,000 in 1992. Obtaining a precise count of the bald eagle population is extremely difficult. The most recent data submitted by individual states was in 2006, when 9789 breeding pairs were reported. For some time, the stronghold breeding population of bald eagles in the lower 48 states was in Florida, where over a thousand pairs have held on while populations in other states were significantly reduced by DDT use. As of 2007, the contiguous state with the largest number of breeding pairs of eagles is Minnesota, with an estimated 1,312 pairs, surpassing Florida's most recent count of 1,166 pairs. 23, or nearly half, of the 48 contiguous states had at least 100 breeding pairs of bald eagles. In Washington State, there were only 105 occupied nests in 1980. That number increased by about 30 per year, so that by 2005 there were 840 occupied nests. 2005 was the last year that the Washington Department of Fish and Wildlife counted occupied nests. Further population increases in Washington may be limited by the availability of late winter food, particularly salmon.

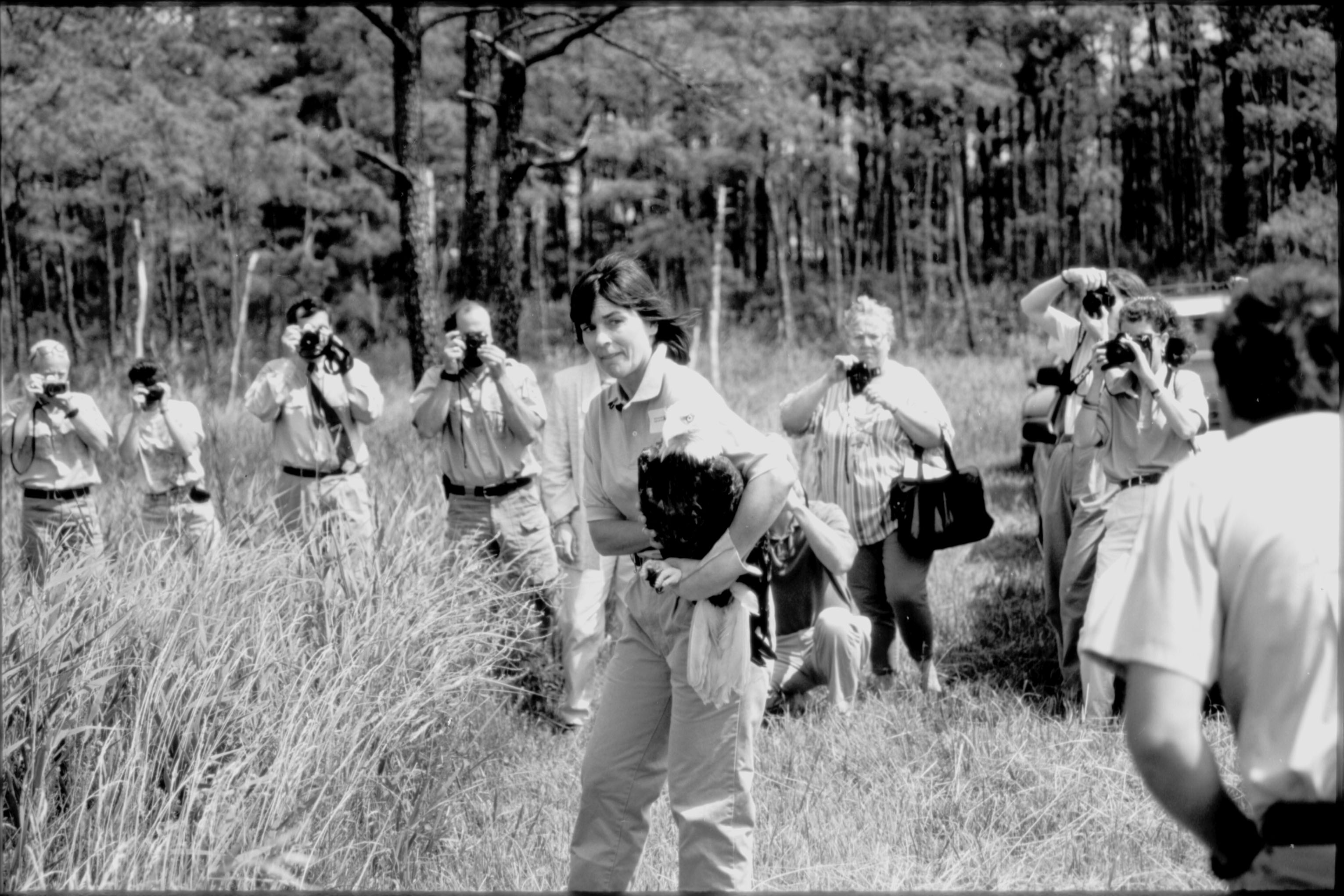
U.S. Fish and Wildlife Service Director Mollie Beattie prepares to release a bald eagle named "Hope" in 1994, marking the announcement that the species was no longer considered endangered.

The bald eagle was officially removed from the U.S. federal government's list of endangered species on July 12, 1995, by the U.S. Fish and Wildlife Service, when it was reclassified from "endangered" to "threatened". On July 6, 1999, a proposal was initiated "To Remove the Bald Eagle in the Lower 48 States From the List of Endangered and Threatened Wildlife". It was de-listed on June 28, 2007. It has also been assigned a risk level of "least-concern" category on the IUCN Red List. In the Exxon Valdez oil spill of 1989, an estimated 247 were killed in Prince William Sound, though the local population returned to its pre-spill level by 1995. In some areas, the increase in eagles has led to decreases in other bird populations and the eagles may be considered a pest.

=== Killing permits ===
In December 2016, the U.S. Fish and Wildlife Service proposed extending the permits issued to wind generation companies to allow them to kill up to 4,200 bald eagles per year without facing a penalty, four times the previous number. The permits would last 30 years, six times the previous five-year term.

=== In captivity ===
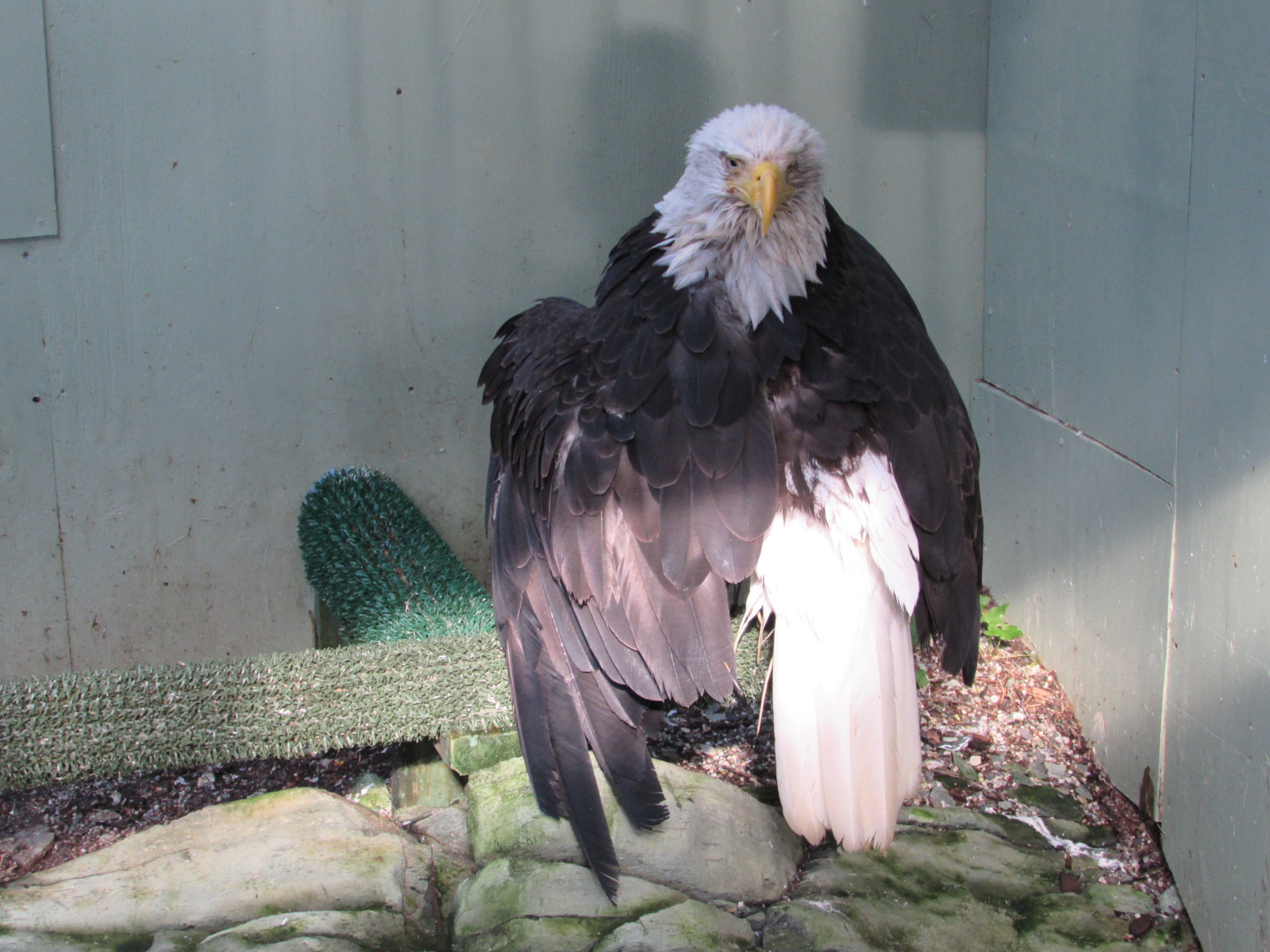
Lady Baltimore, a bald eagle in Alaska who survived a poaching attempt, in her Juneau Raptor Center mews, on August 15, 2015

Permits are required to keep bald eagles in captivity in the United States. Permits are primarily issued to public educational institutions, and the eagles that they show are permanently injured individuals that cannot be released to the wild. The facilities where eagles are kept must be equipped with adequate caging, as well as workers experienced in the handling and care of eagles. The bald eagle can be long-lived in captivity if well cared for, but does not breed well even under the best conditions.

In Canada and England, a license is required to keep bald eagles for falconry. Bald eagles cannot legally be kept for falconry in the United States, but a license may be issued in some jurisdictions to allow use of such eagles in birds-of-prey flight shows.

== Cultural significance ==
The bald eagle is important in various Native American cultures and, as the national symbol of the United States, is prominent in seals and logos, coinage, postage stamps, and other items relating to the U.S. federal government.

The bald eagle is also displayed in the coat of arms of the Philippines, in which it represents its former status as a territory of the United States—even though the bird is not native to the country.

=== Role in Native American culture ===
The bald eagle is a sacred bird in some North American cultures, and its feathers, like those of the golden eagle, are central to many religious and spiritual customs among Native Americans. Eagles are considered spiritual messengers between gods and humans by some cultures. Many powwow dancers use the eagle claw as part of their regalia as well. Eagle feathers are often used in traditional ceremonies, particularly in the construction of regalia worn and as a part of fans, bustles and head dresses. In the Navajo tradition an eagle feather is represented to be a protector, along with the feather Navajo medicine men use the leg and wing bones for ceremonial whistles. The Lakota, for instance, give an eagle feather as a symbol of honor to person who achieves a task. In modern times, it may be given on an event such as a graduation from college. The Pawnee consider eagles as symbols of fertility because their nests are built high off the ground and because they fiercely protect their young. The Choctaw consider the bald eagle, who has direct contact with the upper world of the sun, as a symbol of peace.

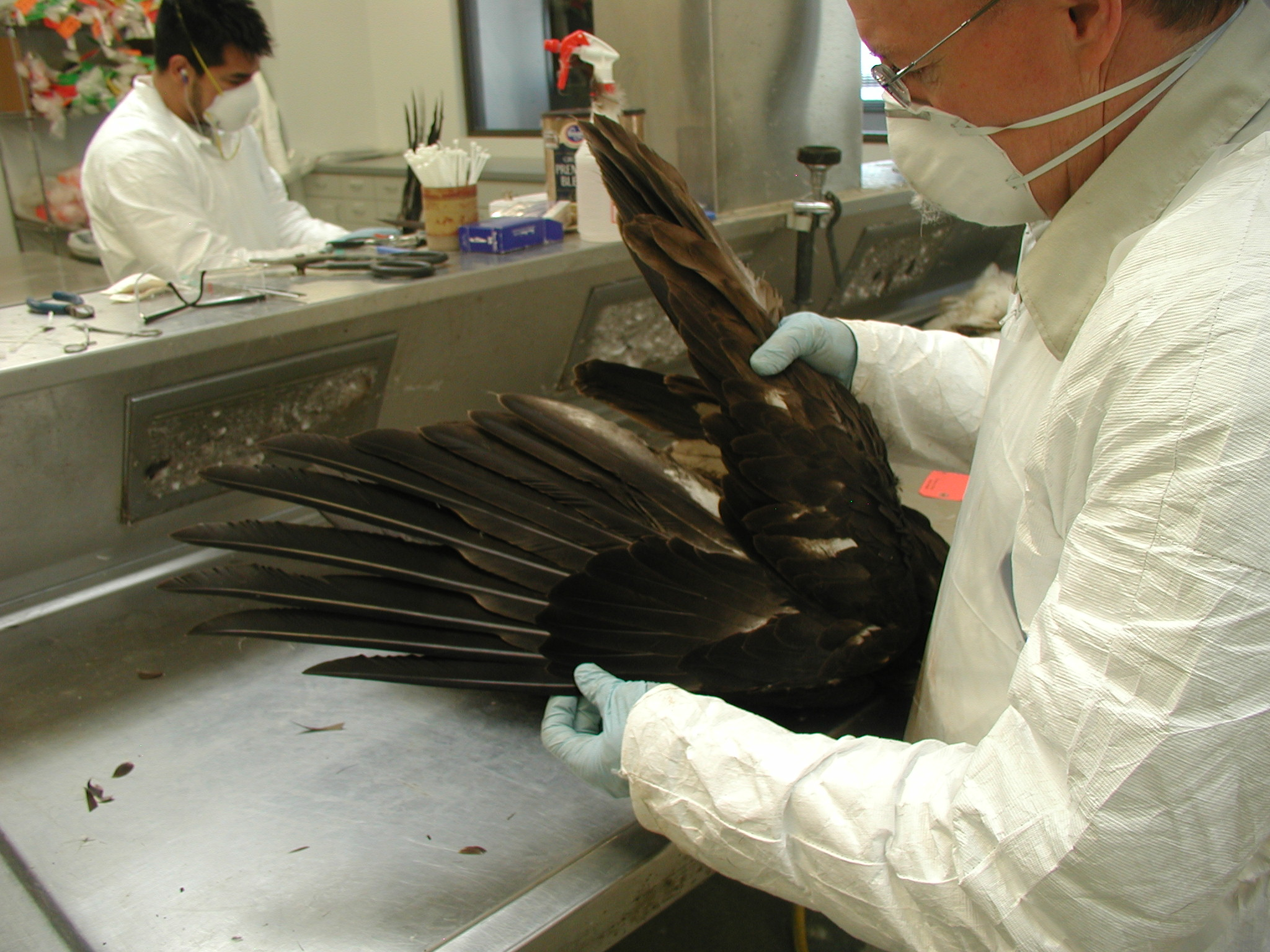
National Eagle Repository processing a bald eagle carcass for Native American use

During the Sun Dance, which is practiced by many Plains Indian tribes, the eagle is represented in several ways. The eagle nest is represented by the fork of the lodge where the dance is held. A whistle made from the wing bone of an eagle is used during the course of the dance. Also during the dance, a medicine man may direct his fan, which is made of eagle feathers, to people who seek to be healed. The medicine man touches the fan to the center pole and then to the patient, in order to transmit power from the pole to the patient. The fan is then held up toward the sky, so that the eagle may carry the prayers for the sick to the Creator.

Eagle feather law stipulates that only individuals of certifiable Native American ancestry enrolled in a federally recognized tribe are legally authorized to obtain or possess bald or golden eagle feathers for religious or spiritual use. The constitutionality of these laws has been questioned by Native American groups on the basis that it violates the First Amendment by affecting ability to practice their religion freely.

The National Eagle Repository, a division of the FWS, exists as a means to receive, process, and store bald and golden eagles which are found dead and to distribute the eagles, their parts and feathers to federally recognized Native American tribes for use in religious ceremonies.

=== National symbol of the United States ===
Seal of the president of the United States

The bald eagle is the national symbol of the United States. It was adopted as a national emblem in 1782. It has long been considered the "national bird", though unofficially until the act of Congress S.4610 was signed into law on December 23, 2024.

The founders of the United States were fond of comparing their new republic with the Roman Republic, in which eagle imagery (usually involving the golden eagle) was prominent. On June 20, 1782, the Continental Congress adopted the design for the Great Seal of the United States, depicting a bald eagle grasping 13 arrows and an olive branch with 13 leaves with its talons.

The bald eagle appears on most official seals of the U.S. government, including the presidential seal, the presidential flag, and in the logos of many U.S. federal agencies. Between 1916 and 1945, the presidential flag (but not the seal) showed an eagle facing to its left (the viewer's right), which gave rise to the urban legend that the flag is changed to have the eagle face towards the olive branch in peace, and towards the arrows in wartime.

Contrary to popular legend, there is no evidence that Benjamin Franklin ever publicly supported the wild turkey (Meleagris gallopavo), rather than the bald eagle, as a symbol of the United States. However, in a letter written to his daughter in 1784 from Paris, criticizing the Society of the Cincinnati, he stated his personal distaste for the bald eagle's behavior. In the letter Franklin states:

For my own part. I wish the bald eagle had not been chosen the representative of our country. He is a bird of bad moral character. He does not get his living honestly ... besides he is a rank coward: The little king bird not bigger than a sparrow attacks him boldly and drives him out of the district.

Franklin opposed the creation of the Society because he viewed it, with its hereditary membership, as a noble order unwelcome in the newly independent Republic, contrary to the ideals of Lucius Quinctius Cincinnatus, for whom the Society was named. His reference to the two kinds of birds is interpreted as a satirical comparison between the Society of the Cincinnati and Cincinnatus.

=== Popular culture ===
Largely because of its role as a symbol of the United States, but also because it is a large predator, the bald eagle is often represented in popular culture. In film and television, the call of the red-tailed hawk is often substituted for the bald eagle's because the former is much louder and more powerful.

== See also ==
- Southwest Florida Eagle Cam
- American bison
- Besnard Lake
- Eagle lady
- Coat of arms of the Philippines
- Old Abe
- List of national birds
