= Besnard Lake =

Lake in Saskatchewan, Canada

- Besnard Lake in Saskatchewan Besnard Lake (Canada)
- Location: Northern Administration District, Saskatchewan
- Coordinates: 55.4167°N 106.0005°W
- Part of: Churchill River drainage basin
- Primary outflows: Besnard Creek
- Basin countries: Canada
- Max. length: 43 km (27 mi)
- Surface area: 12,500 ha (31,000 acres)
- Max. depth: 25 m (82 ft)
- Shore length^{1}: 400 km (250 mi)
- Surface elevation: 385 m (1,263 ft)
- Islands: Robertson Island; Alexander Island; Vicars Island; Wallace Island
- Settlements: None
- ^{1} Shore length is not a well-defined measure.

Besnard Lake (/ˈbɛznɜːrd/ BEZ-nerd) is a lake in the Canadian province of Saskatchewan, 370 kilometres (230 mi) north of Saskatoon and 50 kilometres (31 mi) west of La Ronge. It supports a large population of bald eagles that have been the subject of ongoing studies since the 1960s.

The lake is 43 kilometres (27 mi) from tip to tip with 400 kilometres (250 mi) of shoreline. It has a surface area of 12,500 hectares (31,000 acres) and a maximum depth of 25 metres (82 ft), at an elevation of about 390 metres (1,280 ft). At a narrows it is crossed by a bridge carrying Highway 910. This road was completed in 1973 and increased access to recreational fishing. There are over 250 islands on the lake, and the lakebed is rocky, making navigation difficult but creating a good habitat for fish. There are cabins, campgrounds and fishing camps on the lake. There is a 950 m (3,120 ft) airstrip about 1 kilometre (0.62 mi) south of the lake.

Besnard Lake is within the Churchill River drainage system. While much of the lake is in the Canadian Shield, its southern portion is in the boreal forest where the Mercer River brings nutrients which leads to healthy invertebrate populations that provide plenty of food for the fish which are the mainstay of the eagles' diet. They fish mainly for white sucker and cisco, and occasionally northern pike, walleye, and burbot. Compared to the nearby and similarly sized Nemeiben Lake, which is entirely on the shield, the eagle population has a higher density and stability.

== Bald eagle studies ==
The bald eagle community at Besnard Lake has been studied continuously for over 50 years following their discovery there by Jon Gerrard. In that time eagle population dynamics, behaviour, growth, and migration have been studied, resulting in the publication of more than 50 scientific papers and the 1988 book The Bald Eagle: Haunts and Habits of a Wilderness Monarch. Over 800 eagles have been banded, and have been found to winter mainly between Iowa and Missouri, Wyoming and Montana, but some have been found as far south as Texas, Arizona, and Southern California.

In the 1960s it was considered that bald eagles were rare in Canada away from the Atlantic and Pacific coasts. In 1966 Gerrard found 18 nests with 27 young in the area. A more extensive aerial survey of the region in 1974 found 14,000 eagles. Besnard Lake was found to be a perfect area to study bald eagles in these boreal breeding grounds. The lake has provided habitat for a stable population of about 100 eagles since the 1970s.

One discovery was that the sex of immature eagles could be accurately and efficiently determined by measuring the size of the foot and length of the culmen on the beak. This led to the discovery that the sex of the young seems to be regulated by the quantity of food available, with more females (which are larger than the males) hatching when food is plentiful. On other lakes where food is less plentiful a higher ratio of males hatch.

== Besnard Lake Recreation Site ==
Besnard Lake Recreation Site (55.4073°N 106.0682°W) is a provincial recreation site on the south-western shore of Besnard Lake. Access is from Highway 910. There are two fishing lodges in the park at the lake. Besnard Lake Lodge has modern cabins, boat rentals, and guided fishing packages. Besnard Lake Camp has cabins, campsites, boat rentals, and guided fishing.

== Fish species ==
Fish commonly found in Besnard Lake include walleye, burbot, lake whitefish, northern pike, white sucker, cisco, and yellow perch.

== See also ==
- List of lakes of Saskatchewan
