= Besnard Point =

- Location within Antarctica

Highest point
- Coordinates: 64°50′S 63°29′W

Geography
- Location: Port Lockroy, Wiencke Island

Besnard Point is a headland which lies at the southeast side of Port Lockroy, Wiencke Island, and marks the east side of the entrance to Alice Creek, in the Palmer Archipelago. It was discovered by the French Antarctic Expedition, 1903–05, under Jean-Baptiste Charcot, and named by him for A. Besnard, seaman on the expedition ship Français.
