= Wagner Murals =

Mural fragments from Teotihuacán removed in the 1960s

The Wagner Murals are the name for over 70 mural fragments illegally removed from the Pre-Columbian site of Teotihuacán in the 1960s.

== Murals of Teotihuacan ==
The murals of Teotihuacán are very different from artistic representations found in neighboring centers. Few aspects of daily life are represented; the murals are predominantly abstract depictions of mythical deities that probably reflect a communal belief system. Teotihuacán is also unique in the fact that, even though it is contemporaneous with initial Mayan centers, there are relatively few hieroglyphic inscriptions. Esther Pasztory, of the Teotihuacán Murals Project, has postulated that they wanted to create an art style distinctly different the preceding Olmec culture and the contemporaneous Mayan centers. They were not interested in displaying a succession of kingship as commonly shown in other cultures of the area.

Early murals at the site are generally found located in small temples along the Avenue of the Dead and depict animals such as quetzals and felines as well as various plant varieties. During the Xolalpan stage of Teotihuacán (~AD 400), however, murals could be found in a wider variety of structures including many porticoes of apartment compounds. Additionally, themes of mythical supernatural deities and the increase in hieroglyphic notations led Pasztory to conclude that this change may mark a sort of decentralization within the society.

The Wagner Murals may help to show this process of decentralization. One of the best examples of this transition comes from the Feathered Serpents and Flowering Trees mural. While there are depictions of serpents and floral aspects common in early Teotihuacán artwork, within the flowering trees there are relatively rare depictions of simple glyphs. In all, there are four feathered serpents (two from the Wagner Collection) that accompany nine plants each. It has been suggested from some scholars that these nine plants with nine different glyphs may represent the nine lords of the underworld. It also may be one of the first references of the migration myth of the eight tribes of the Aztecs leaving the cave of origin.

Another predominant theme represented in a number of the Wagner Murals is the image of a figure wearing a three-tassel headdress. Thought to be connected with independent collections called the St. Louis and San Francisco Collections respectively, these figures are presumed to be originally found in Techinantila compound of Teotihuacán. Additional figures of similar form and colorations are found in the Houston and Milwaukee Collections. All of the figures are facing to the right and disks are placed at regular intervals above the depictions. If the proportions of this room were equivalent to those found in Teopancaxco (9mx3.4m), then this mural would have contained 20 figures surrounding the room, possibly led by the Storm God. Additionally, various glyphs under many of these tasseled headdresses may denote the individual names with which they are associated. As there are no discernible borders at the corners where the mural would be adjoined, these figures are thought to have been read continuously as one viewed them from wall to wall. A border of footprints along the top of the mural pieces helps to strengthen this notion.

While the figures in this particular group seem to represent specific people or deities in Teotihuacán, the three-tassel headdress also seems to become a symbol for the people themselves. In distant areas like Tikal, for example, this three-tassel motif also shows up. On Stela 31 there is a depiction of what may be a military figure with a shield that is adorned with this very symbol. On a further note, the Storm God is always shown with the tassel headdress. Additionally, there are connections of the headdress to Great Goddess as seen in the Tetitla compound. This helps to show how these murals, while out of context, can help growing scholarship on interpretation. These murals could aid in Pasztory's notion of the transition in Teotihuacán culture. In the time of the Wagner Murals, iconography was used denote communal ideology and individual identification as well.

Almost all of the fragments were traced back in 1983 and 1984 by Rene Millon to the Techinantitla compound, some 500 yards east of the Avenue of the Dead and Pyramid of the Moon. The remainder of the fragments were traced by Millon to the Tlacuilapaxco compound.

== Origin of the Collection ==
Harald Wagner was born in Falls City, Oregon in 1903. He later went on to obtain a degree in Architecture from the University of Oregon at Eugene. In 1927, Wagner moved to San Francisco and went to work as a draftsman for the architectural firm of Bliss & Faville. It was here that Wagner became adamantly interested in art. Influenced by his mentor, William Faville, and Arthur and Lucia Mathews, popular decor artists in the area, Wagner began to learn and collect art from around the world. In the 1950s, he traveled for the first time to Mexico. He eventually purchased a house there where he lived part-time. It was here that, in the mid-1960s, he began to acquire a collection of mural pieces from the city of Teotihuacán. His combined interest in architecture and its various artistic components fueled his ambition and his collection quickly grew to over seventy pieces. Although it seems that his original intention of this collection was to sell it for profit, increased awareness of the ethical implications of acquiring such collections nullified their marketability. In the end, Wagner donated the entire collection to the de Young Museum in San Francisco, USA, as part of his will shortly following his death in 1976.

Since that time, the collection has been extensively studied by numerous academics of Teotihuacán culture. Because of excessive looting at the site of Teotihuacán, partly due to illegal sacking for the private market, academic and archeological work has been painstakingly difficult to undertake. Very few murals were known in situ before the emergence of the Wagner Murals.
