= Chiik Naab murals =

Ancient Maya mural paintings in Mexico

Chiik Naab mural paintings
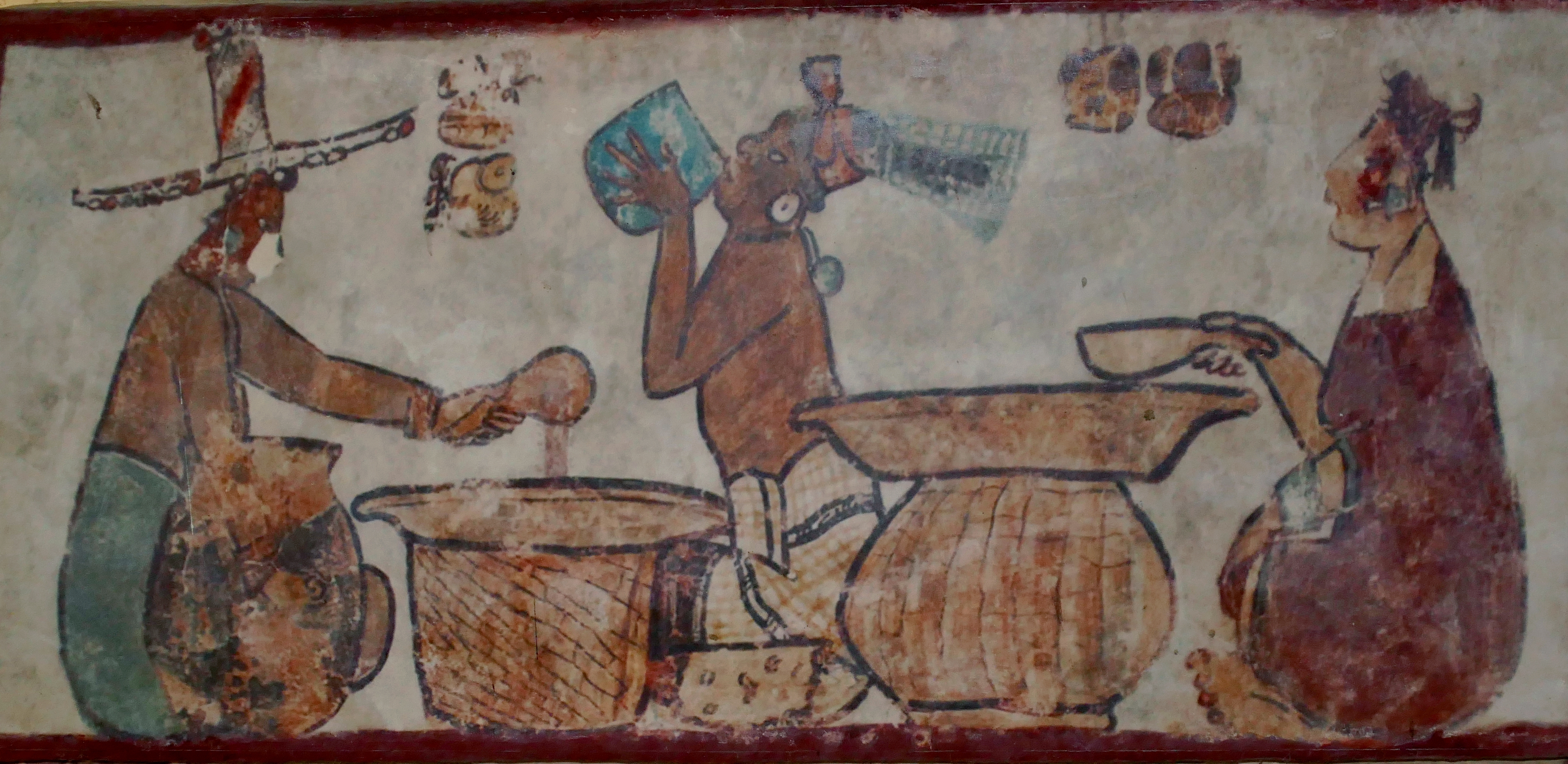
- Artist: Maya civilization
- Year: 650 - 700 AD
- Medium: Fresco
- Location: Calakmul, Mexico

The Chiik Naab murals are a group of ancient Maya mural paintings located in a substructure of building 1 at the great acropolis of Chiik Naab in the Maya city of Calakmul in southern Campeche, Mexico. The paintings show various scenes of the daily life in the Maya city that includes the consumption of food and drink such as tamales and atole and the commerce by local market people.

The murals stand out for their high conservation grade and for the unique content of their scenes. While the vast majority of Maya art and works illustrate political or religious themes highlighting the image of god or rulers, the Chiik Naab murals are entirely social scenes, a subject that is rarely represented, showing the image of a Maya market which has contributed to understanding the cultural traditions and daily lifestyle of the pre-Hispanic Maya society.

The murals were discovered in 2004 during an archaeological research in building 1 of the Chiik Naab acropolis where a big substructure was found inside consisting of a 12 metres high stepped pyramidal building completely covered by the mural paintings and whose construction is estimated to have been between the years 650 and 700 AD.

== Description ==
The discovered murals are around 18 Maya daily life scenes in a vertical format and delimited by a red border with a color palette of around 15 different tones. One of the paintings, commonly called The Lady of the Tamales, shows an everyday scene within the ancient Maya society with two seated characters, a woman with an elegant hat next to a basket serving and offering a plate of tamales while a man eats them. The upper Maya hieroglyphic text shows the inscription aj-waaj, "aj" being a grammatical prefix meaning "person of" and "waaj" meaning tamale, translated as “person of the tamale,” referring to the woman.

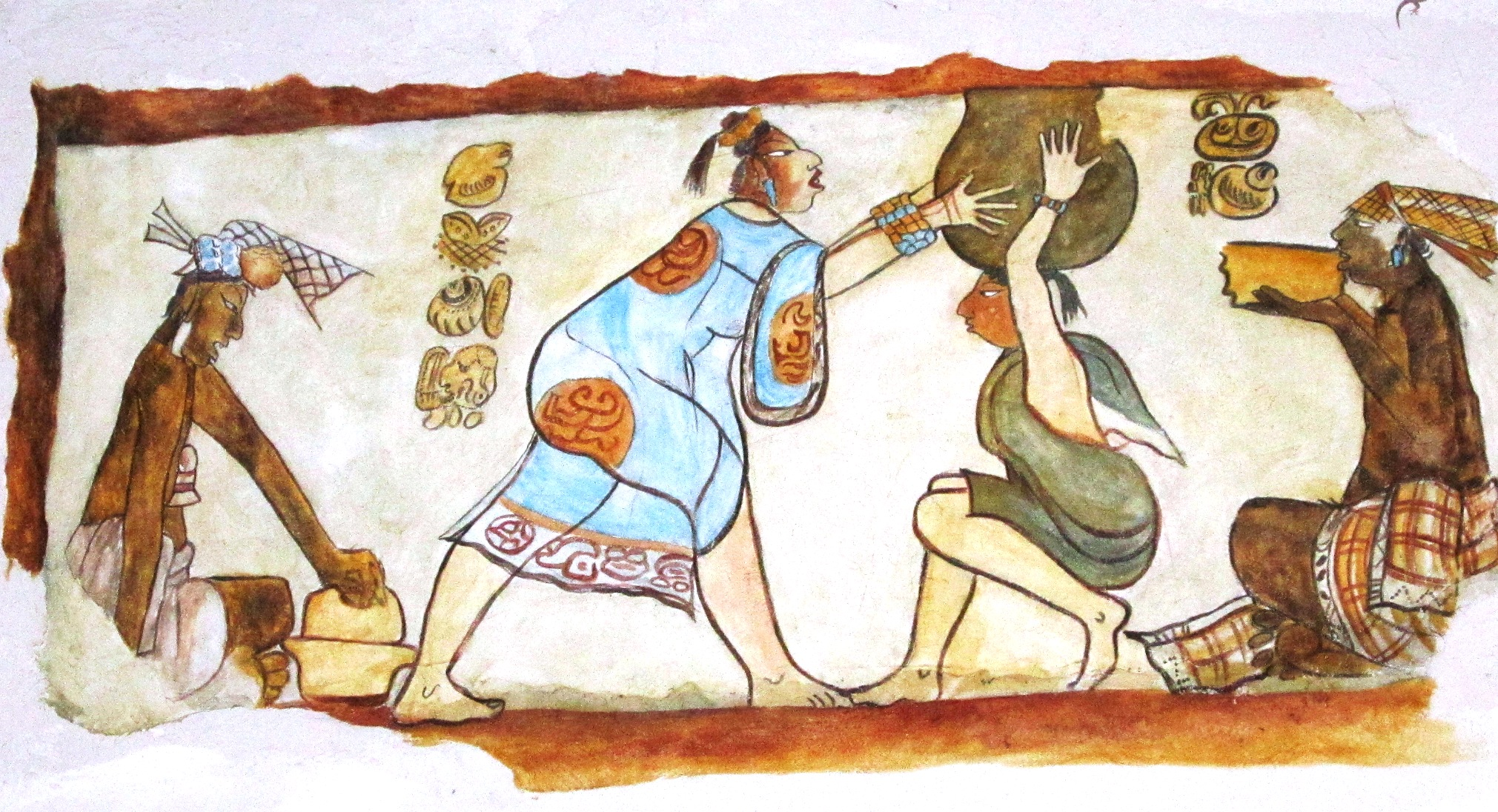
Atole

In one of the scenes, a woman is seen carrying a large clay pot on her head while another woman, finely dressed in a transparent blue cloth, helps her to carry it. On the right, a man is seen sitting and drinking a large bowl of atole, he is referred as aj-ul “person of the atole,” as indicated by the Maya inscription in the hieroglyphic text on the upper right.
