= Esther Pasztory =

American art historian (1943–2024)

Esther Pasztory (June 21, 1943 – June 25, 2024) was a professor of Pre-Columbian art history at Columbia University. From 1997 to her retirement in 2013, she held the Lisa and Bernard Selz Chair in Art History and Archaeology. Among her many publications are the first art historical manuscripts on Teotihuacan and the Aztecs. She has been the recipient of a Guggenheim Fellowship (1987–88) and a senior fellow of the board of Dumbarton Oaks.

== Biography and education ==
Pasztory was born in Hungary and immigrated to the United States in 1956 after the anti-Communist revolutions. She was initially educated at Vassar College but later transferred to Barnard College where she received her B.A. in art history in 1965. She received her Ph.D. from Columbia in 1971 for a dissertation entitled "The Murals of Tepantitla, Teotihuacan". Her research into the Great Goddess of Teotihuacan has been influential and provided the basis for many later art historical studies.

== Publications ==
- 1974, The iconography of the Teotihuacan Tlaloc
- 1976, Aztec Stone Sculpture by Esther Pasztory (Editor)
- 1976, Murals of Tepantitla, Teotihuacan by Esther Pasztory
- 1978, Middle Classic Mesoamerica, A.D. 400-700
- 1983, Aztec art
- 1994, Teotihuacan: Art from the City of the Gods by Kathleen Berrin (Editor), Esther Pasztory (Editor)
- 1997, Teotihuacan : an experiment in living
- 1998, Pre-Columbian art
- 2003, Daughter of the Pyramids by Esther Pasztory
- 2005, Thinking with things : toward a new vision of art
- 2008, Remove Trouble from Your Heart, A Memoir by Esther Pasztory
- 2010, Jean-Frédéric Waldeck : artist of exotic Mexico by Esther Pasztory
- 2010, Inka cubism: Reflections on Andean art by Esther Pasztory
- 2015, Aliens and Fakes: Popular Theories About the Origins of Ancient Americans by Dr Esther Pasztory(Author)
- 2017, Visual Culture of the Ancient Americas : Contemporary Perspectives
- 2017, Conversations with Quetzalcoatl and Other Stories Kindle Edition by Esther Pasztory (Author)
- 2020, Exile Space: Encountering Ancient and Modern America in Memoir with Essay and Fiction by Esther Pasztory (Author)
