= Hooker =

Hooker may refer to:

== Places ==
=== Antarctica ===
- Mount Hooker (Antarctica)
- Cape Hooker (Antarctica)
- Cape Hooker (South Shetland Islands)

=== New Zealand ===
- Hooker River
- Hooker Valley Track
- Mount Hooker (New Zealand) in the Southern Alps
- Hooker Glacier (New Zealand), in the Southern Alps

=== United States ===
- Hooker, California, an unincorporated community
- Hooker, Georgia, an unincorporated community
- Little Goose Creek (Kentucky), location of Hooker post office and river branch
- Hooker, Missouri, a ghost town
- Hooker, Ohio, an unincorporated community
- Hooker, Oklahoma, a city
- Hooker, South Dakota, an unincorporated community
- Hooker County, Nebraska
- Hooker Township, Dixon County, Nebraska
- Hooker Township, Gage County, Nebraska
- Hooker Dam, a proposed dam on the Gila River in New Mexico
- Hooker Falls, North Carolina
- Mount Hooker (Wyoming)

=== Elsewhere ===
- Mount Hooker (Canada), a mountain on the Continental Divide and border between British Columbia and Alberta, Canada
- Hooker and Brown, mythical mountains alleged to exist in the Canadian Rockies
- Hooker Island, Franz Josef Land, Russia
- Hookers Point, Falkland Islands

== In sport ==
- Hooker (rugby league), one of the positions in rugby league football
- Hooker, one of the positions in rugby union football
- In cricket, a batsman who plays the hook shot
- An expert practitioner of catch wrestling
- Hooker, book by Lou Thesz on professional wrestling
- A boxer who is particularly known for throwing hooks

== Other uses ==
- Hooker (surname)
- Prostitute, colloquially called a "hooker"
- Galway hooker, a traditional Irish fishing boat
- Hooker Telescope, a 100-inch telescope at Mount Wilson Observatory
- Hooker Emerald, a 75-carat (15.0 g) emerald owned by the Smithsonian Institution
- The title character of T. J. Hooker, an American police drama television program, played by William Shatner
- "Hooker", a song by Pink from the album Try This
- Hooker's Green, a particular mixture of green and blue

== See also ==
- Hooker Creek (disambiguation)
