= Huka (disambiguation) =

Huka is a genus of spiders found in New Zealand.

Huka may also refer to:

- Huka Entertainment, music festival producer and promoter based in New Orleans
- Huka Falls, waterfall on the Waikato River in Taupō, New Zealand
- Huka Prawn Park, tourist attraction in New Zealand
- Lake Huka, historic lake in the North Island of New Zealand
- Mohamed Huka Adan (died 2019), Kenyan politician

== See also ==
- Hookah (disambiguation)
- Hooker (disambiguation)
