= Mount Hooker =

Mount Hooker is the name of several mountains worldwide:

- Mount Hooker (Antarctica)
- Mount Hooker (Canada), a mountain on the Continental Divide and border between British Columbia and Alberta, Canada
  - Hooker and Brown, mythical mountains alleged to exist in the Canadian Rockies
- Mount Hooker (New Zealand) in the Southern Alps
- Mount Hooker (Wyoming), United States
