= Cape Hooker =

Cape Hooker may refer to:

- Cape Hooker (South Shetland Islands)
- Cape Hooker (Antarctica)
