= Silene seelyi =

Conservation status
- Imperiled (NatureServe)

Scientific classification
- Kingdom: Plantae
- Clade: Tracheophytes
- Clade: Angiosperms
- Clade: Eudicots
- Order: Caryophyllales
- Family: Caryophyllaceae
- Genus: Silene
- Species: S. seelyi

Binomial name
- Silene seelyi Morton & J.W.Thomp.

Species of flowering plant

Silene seelyi is a species of flowering plant in the family Caryophyllaceae known by the common names Seely's catchfly and Seely's silene. It is endemic to Washington state in the United States, where it is limited to the Wenatchee Mountains of Chelan and Kittitas Counties.

This perennial herb grows from a taproot and branching caudex. The branching stems are up to 30 centimeters long. The thin leaves are mainly lance-shaped and measure up to 2 centimeters long. They are oppositely arranged on the stem. The inflorescence contains many leaves and a few flowers. The flowers have bell-shaped calyces of green sepals and lobed petals which may be dark red, white or purplish.

This plant grows on cliffs. It can be found in shady crevices on steep slopes and talus. Other species in the habitat my include alumroot (Heuchera cylindrica), Chelan penstemon (Penstemon pruinosus) and Wallace's selaginella (Selaginella wallacei).

There are few threats to this species because it occurs in nearly inaccessible habitat. The main threat is rock climbers. Cliffs used by climbers have fewer plants than pristine cliffs.
