= Matthews Ridge =

Matthews Ridge may refer to:

- Matthews Ridge, Guyana, a village in Guyana
- Matthews Ridge, Antarctica, a snow-covered ridge on the south side of Tapsell Foreland, Victoria Land
