= Mount Lander (Fremont County, Wyoming) =

Mountain in the state of Wyoming

- Location within Wyoming Location within the United States

Highest point
- Elevation: 12,623 ft (3,847 m)
- Prominence: 783 ft (239 m)
- Parent peak: Roberts Mountain (12,774 ft)
- Isolation: 2.29 mi (3.69 km)
- Coordinates: 42°53′02″N 109°19′19″W

Geography
- Country: United States
- State: Wyoming
- County: Fremont
- Protected area: Wind River Roadless Area
- Parent range: Wind River Range
- Topo map: USGS Roberts Mountain

Mount Lander (12,623 ft (3,847 m)) is located in the central Wind River Range in the U.S. state of Wyoming. Mount Lander is within the Wind River Indian Reservation. The Lander Glacier consists of three distinct glaciers on the north and west slopes of Mount Lander, with the westernmost glacier being the largest. Baptiste Lake is 1 mi (1.6 km) long and is on the southeast base of Mount Lander and the famous northeast wall of Mount Hooker is another mile south of the lake.

== Hazards ==
Encountering bears is a concern in the Wind River Range. There are other concerns as well, including bugs, wildfires, adverse snow conditions and nighttime cold temperatures.

Importantly, there have been notable incidents, including accidental deaths, due to falls from steep cliffs (a misstep could be fatal in this class 4/5 terrain) and due to falling rocks, over the years, including 1993, 2007 (involving an experienced NOLS leader), 2015 and 2018. Other incidents include a seriously injured backpacker being airlifted near SquareTop Mountain in 2005, and a fatal hiker incident (from an apparent accidental fall) in 2006 that involved state search and rescue. The U.S. Forest Service does not offer updated aggregated records on the official number of fatalities in the Wind River Range.
