= Hooker Creek (disambiguation) =

Hooker Creek is a stream in the U.S. state of California

Hooker Creek also may refer to.

- An earlier name for Lajamanu, Northern Territory, a community in Australia
- Hooker Creek Airport, an airport in Australia

== See also ==
- Hooker (disambiguation)
- Hooker River
