= Huka pallida =

Conservation status
- Not Threatened (NZ TCS)

Scientific classification
- Kingdom: Animalia
- Phylum: Arthropoda
- Subphylum: Chelicerata
- Class: Arachnida
- Order: Araneae
- Infraorder: Araneomorphae
- Family: Agelenidae
- Genus: Huka
- Species: H. pallida

Binomial name
- Huka pallida Forster & Wilton, 1973

Species of spider

Huka pallida is a species of Agelenidae that is endemic to New Zealand.

== Taxonomy ==
This species was described in 1973 by Ray Forster and Cecil Wilton from male and female specimens. The holotype is stored in Otago Museum.

== Description ==
The male is recorded at 1.14mm in length whereas the female is 1.38mm. The cephalothorax and legs are coloured pale yellow. The abdomen is creamy.

== Distribution ==
This species is known from numerous localities throughout New Zealand.

== Conservation status ==
Under the New Zealand Threat Classification System, this species is listed as "Not Threatened".
