= Hooker and Brown =

Mythical mountains of the Canadian Rockies

Hooker and Brown are two mythical mountains, once reputed to lie on the Great Divide of the Canadian Rockies in Jasper National Park, bordering the Athabasca Pass, the old passage for the fur trade. These two peaks were reputed to be the highest mountains in North America at over 16,000 feet (4,900 m), and were maintained to be so on maps and atlases for almost a hundred years, spurring the early mountaineers arriving on the railway (1890) to explore the Rockies and discover features such as the Columbia Icefield.

== Discovery and naming ==
David Thompson, a Canadian surveyor, explorer and geographer, first established the route through Athabasca Pass in January 1811 when the Peigan closed Howse Pass to prevent his trading with their rivals, the Kootenay people. Although he mapped the route carefully, Thompson was not interested in mountains and did not name or note them in his journals. His journey joined with the Columbia River and the trail became the premier trade passage over the Rockies until the decline of the fur trade.

In April 1827, David Douglas, a Scottish biologist collecting for the Royal Botanic Institution of Glasgow, and sponsored by Sir William Hooker, crossed the pass. Lagging the other voyageurs, he made an unprecedented decision to abandon the trail and to ascend the northern peak in deep snow.

"After breakfast at one o’clock, being, as I conceive, on the highest part of the route, I became desirous of ascending one of the peaks, and accordingly I set out alone on snowshoes to that on the left hand or west side, being to all appearances the highest. The labour of ascending the lower part, which is covered with pines, is great beyond description, sinking on many occasions to the middle. Halfway up vegetation ceases entirely, not so much a vestige of moss or lichen on the stones. Here I found it less laborious as I walked on the hard crust. One-third from the summit it becomes a mountain of pure ice, sealed far over by Nature’s hand as a momentous work of Nature’s God. ... The view from the summit is of too awful a cast to afford pleasure. Nothing can be seen, in every direction as far as the eye can reach, except mountains towering above each other, rugged beyond description. ... The height from its base may be about 5,500 feet; timber 2,750 feet; a few mosses and lichens 500 more; 1,000 feet of perpetual snow; the remainder, towards the top, 1,250, as I have said, glacier with a thin covering of snow on it. The ascent took me five hours; descending only one and a quarter. ... This peak, the highest yet known in the northern continent of America, I feel a sincere pleasure in naming Mount Brown, in honour of R. Brown, Esq., the illustrious botanist... A little to the southward is one nearly the same height, rising into a sharper point. This I named Mount Hooker [after his sponsor, William Hooker] ..."

== Historical mystery and impact ==
Douglas did not know of the height of the Athabasca Pass when he crossed. A Lieutenant Simpson in a party just before him measured the pass at 11,000 feet (3,400 m), while its true height is only 1,753 metres (5,751 ft). The officer bore a name so similar to Lieutenant-Governor Sir George Simpson that many attributed his erroneous elevation calculation to the more eminent person, and thus gave it credibility. Douglas wrote in his published journal:

"Being well rested by one o'clock, I set out with the view of ascending what seemed to be the highest peak on the north. Its height does not seem to be less than 16,000 or 17,000 feet above the level of the sea. After passing over the lower ridge I came to about 1,200 feet of, by far, the most difficult and fatiguing walking I have ever experienced, and the utmost care was required to tread over the crust of the snow..."

But Douglas was off on another expedition (one from which he would not return, as his eyesight had become so poor that he fell into an occupied wild boar trap on the Sandwich Isles – Hawaii) when his journal was published. The editing of his journal may have been conducted by Hooker himself, which calls into question the motivation and objectivity of such a noted figure. This publication was in a secondary journal which was quickly forgotten, however, the heights had made an indelible impression, most notably on Aaron Arrowsmith, the great English mapmaker.

On all maps following the publication of the journal, maps of the Rockies showed Hooker and Brown between 15,000 and 17,000 feet tall. When the transcontinental railway was pushing through the mountains on it way to join with the British Columbian spur, it opened the area to the mountaineers of Europe and the East Coast. After Mount Assiniboine was summitted, a race began to claim the highest peaks. The maps unequivocally stated that Hooker and Brown were thus, but after several seasons of exploring and hardship, no trace of such high mountains were found. They did impel the men to discover and map the entire Rocky Mountains system of ranges.

The peaks remain a fable of the twenty-first century. Albertan author Jerry Auld's 2009 novel, Hooker & Brown, is centred on the mythology and the mystery of the mountains.

The real mountain (perhaps only partially) climbed by Douglas on the westside of the pass retains the name Mount Brown but is only 2,791 metres (9,157 ft) high. The name Mount Hooker, the name given by Douglas to a summit "a little to the southward" and "nearly the same height", was given to a peak 9 km ENE of Mount Brown and 3,287 metres (10,784 ft) in height. It was climbed only in 1924, nearly a century after Douglas's visit of Mount Brown. The mountain Douglas named Mount Hooker more likely is McGillivray Ridge (or Rock) (2,697 metres (8,848 ft)), which had been named years before Douglas crossed the Athabasca Pass.

== Timeline ==
Year	Event
1811	David Thompson establishes the fur trade through Athabasca Pass.
1826	Thomas Drummond, another biologist, and Lieutenant Simpson, an officer, cross the pass. Simpson makes a boiling point calculation for elevation, fixing the pass at 11,000 feet (3,400 m).
1826	Lieutenant-Governor George Simpson crosses the pass.
1827	David Douglas crosses the pass, climbs northern peak.
1827	Drummond and Douglas meet at York Factory waiting for boats home. Drummond tells Douglas that Simpson set the height at 11,000 feet.
1834	Douglas killed in Hawaii, Drummond in Cuba.
1834	Hooker publishes Douglas’s journal in the Companion to the Botanical Magazine v 2
1844	Aaron Arrowsmith's maps of North America include Hooker and Brown at 16,000 ft.
1857	David Thompson dies. Most maps are lost and fur trails forgotten.
1885	Professor of geology at Toronto, Arthur Philemon Coleman, takes second trip west (first expedition to look for Hooker and Brown) on the unfinished railway.
1888	Coleman tries to reach Athabasca Pass from the west, going up the Columbia River.
1892	Coleman tries to reach Athabasca Pass from the south. Reaches Fortress Lake.
1893	Coleman reaches Athabasca Pass from the North (the Yellowhead via Miette) and is disappointed to find no mountains of stature.
1896	J. Norman Collie arrives in Rockies. The death of Charles Fay from his party on Mount Lefroy ignites a scandal and highlights the potential for mountaineering in Canada.
1897	J. Norman Collie and party summit Mount Gordon and look north at distant giant. Start off for Mount Murchison and Mount Forbes (thinking they might be Hooker and Brown) and decide to forgo the virgin Mount Assiniboine.
1898	Collie searches again for Hooker and Brown. Later, in England, reads Douglas’s journal and decides the entire story is a mistake.
1900	Collie is back, still searching.
1901	James Outram, on leave from England, climbs Mount Assiniboine.
1902	Outram and Collie race north, looking for the highest, and succeed in climbing Mount Forbes, Mount Freshfield, Mount Bryce, and Mount Columbia. The search for Hooker and Brown is abandoned.
