= Roberts Mountain =

Mountain in Wyoming, United States

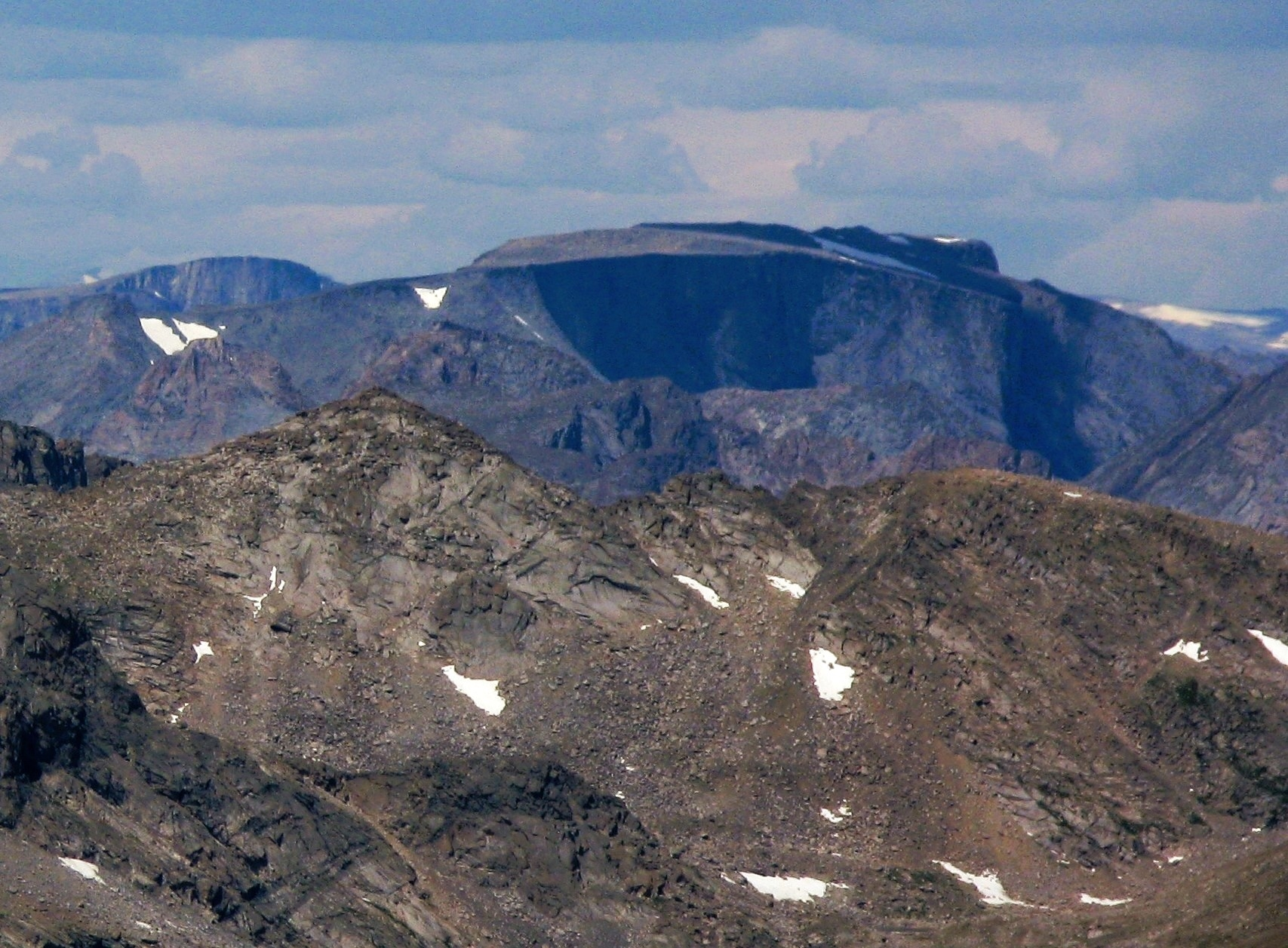
- Southeast aspect (skyline, center)

Highest point
- Elevation: 12,774 ft (3,894 m)
- Prominence: 1,588 ft (484 m)
- Parent peak: Lizard Head Peak (12,847 ft)
- Isolation: 9.99 mi (16.08 km)
- Coordinates: 42°54′55″N 109°17′45″W

Naming
- Etymology: Reverend John Roberts

Geography
- Location within Wyoming Location within the United States
- Country: United States
- State: Wyoming
- County: Fremont
- Protected area: Wind River Roadless Area
- Parent range: Wind River Range
- Topo map: USGS Roberts Mountain

Geology
- Rock type: granitic gneiss

Climbing
- Easiest route: class 2

Roberts Mountain is a 12,774-foot-elevation (3,894-meter) summit in Fremont County, Wyoming, United States.

== Description ==
Roberts Mountain is located 2.5 miles east of the Continental Divide in the remote Wind River Range. It is the highest point in the Wind River Indian Reservation as well as the central portion of the range, and it ranks as the 55th-highest in Wyoming. Neighbors include Mount Lander, 2.54 miles to the south-southwest, and Pronghorn Peak 3.61 miles to the southwest. Topographic relief is significant as the summit rises over 2,000 feet (610 meters) above Roberts Lake in 0.75 mile (1.2 km) and 2,700 feet (823 meters) above Lake Polaris in 0.75 mile (1.2 km). Precipitation runoff from the mountain drains to the Little Wind River. In August 1978, Fred Beckey, Doug Randall, and Mark Meng climbed a 1500-foot route on the mile-wide east face of this mountain. This landform's toponym has been officially adopted by the U.S. Board on Geographic Names. Reverend John Roberts (1853–1949) was a missionary to the Shoshone and Arapahoe peoples of the Wind River Indian Reservation area and he was the first principal of the reservation's school.

== Climate ==
According to the Köppen climate classification system, Roberts Mountain is located in an alpine subarctic climate zone with long, cold, snowy winters, and cool to warm summers. Due to its altitude, it receives precipitation all year, as snow in winter, and as thunderstorms in summer.

== Hazards ==
Encountering bears is a concern in the Wind River Range. There are other concerns as well, including bugs, wildfires, adverse snow conditions and nighttime cold temperatures.

Importantly, there have been notable incidents, including accidental deaths, due to falls from steep cliffs (a misstep could be fatal in this class 4/5 terrain) and due to falling rocks, over the years, including 1993, 2007 (involving an experienced NOLS leader), 2015 and 2018. A 54-year-old climber from Durango fell 400–800 feet to his death from Steeple Peak in 2017. Other incidents include a seriously injured backpacker being airlifted near Squaretop Mountain in 2005, and a fatal hiker incident (from an apparent accidental fall) in 2006 that involved state search and rescue. The U.S. Forest Service does not offer updated aggregated records on the official number of fatalities in the Wind River Range.

== See also ==
- List of mountain peaks of Wyoming
