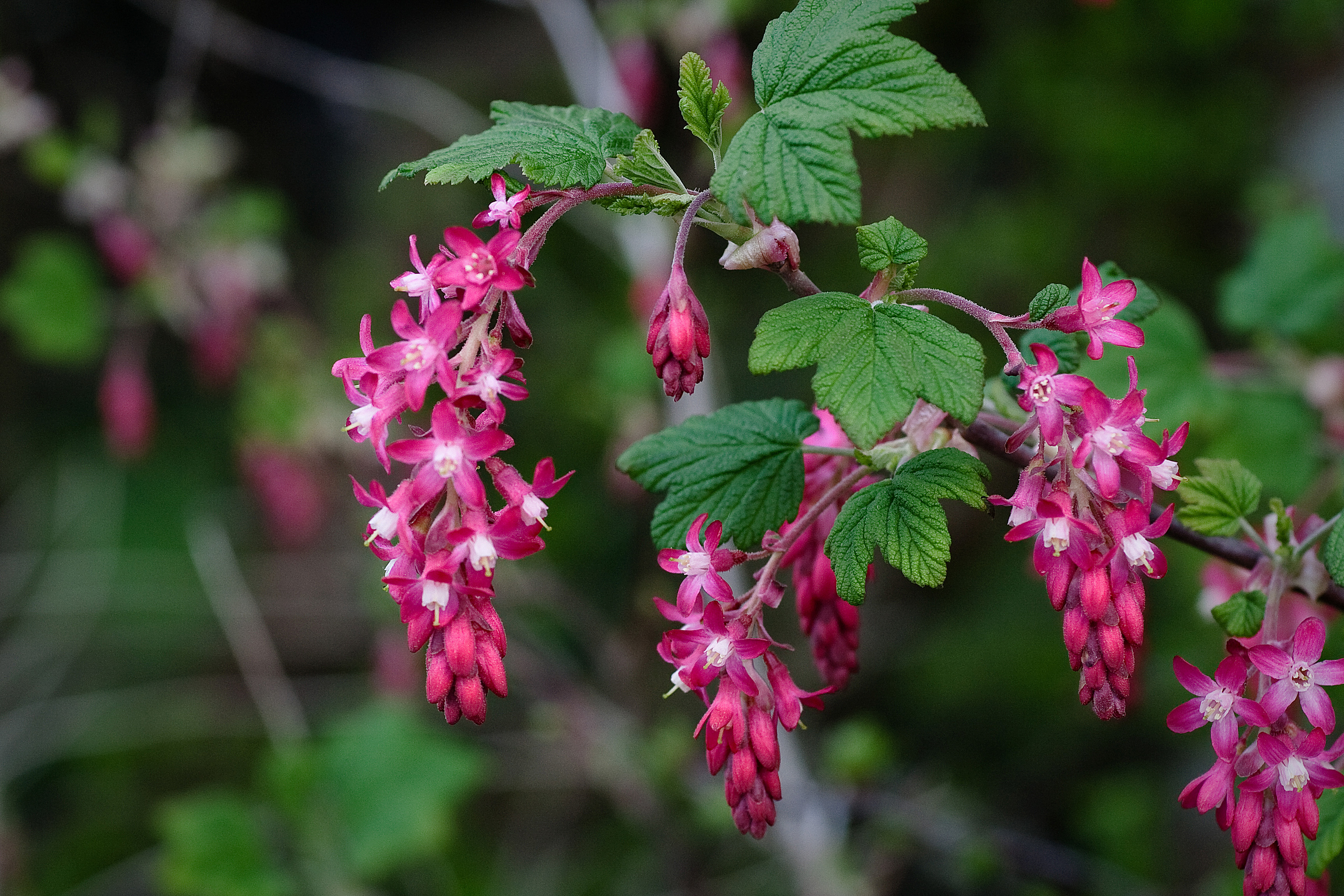

Conservation status
- Secure (NatureServe)

Scientific classification
- Kingdom: Plantae
- Clade: Tracheophytes
- Clade: Angiosperms
- Clade: Eudicots
- Order: Saxifragales
- Family: Grossulariaceae
- Genus: Ribes
- Species: R. sanguineum

Binomial name
- Ribes sanguineum Pursh 1813
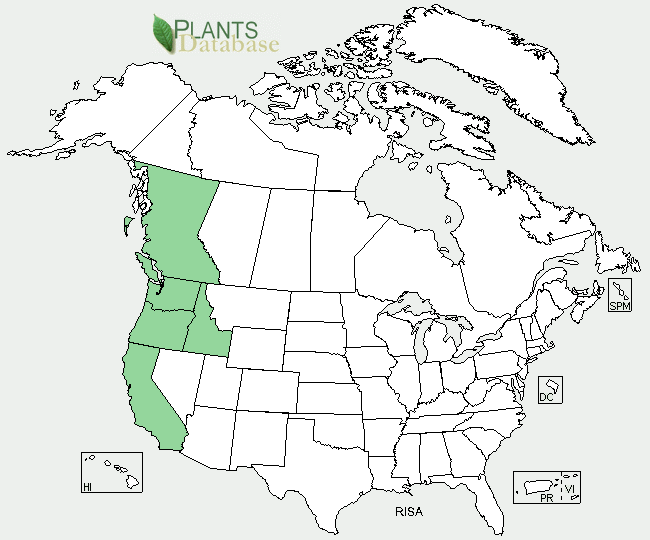
- States and territories where it is native

Synonyms
- Calobotrya sanguinea (Pursh) Spach; Coreosma sanguinea (Pursh) Spach

= Ribes sanguineum =

Species of flowering plant in the gooseberry family

Ribes sanguineum, the flowering currant, redflower currant, red-flowering currant, or red currant is a North American species of flowering plant in the family Grossulariaceae. It is native to the western United States and Canada.

== Distribution ==
It is native to the western United States, Canada and Mexico. In western British Columbia, Washington, and Oregon, it is distributed widely in the moist regions west of the Cascades. In California it is restricted to areas near the coast, and can be found as far south as Santa Barbara County. In Mexico, it is only found on the Pacific island of Guadalupe, where it may be extirpated. Although its conservation status is secure across the rest of its range, in Idaho it is critically imperiled and is found only rarely in Bonner, Kootenai, Benewah, and Adams counties.

It is widely cultivated and naturalized throughout temperate Europe and Australasia.

== Description ==
It is a deciduous shrub growing to 3 metres (10 feet) tall and broad. It is naturally multi-stemmed with an upright-arching to rounded habit, although it can be grown in tree form. The bark is dark brownish-grey with prominent paler brown lenticels.

The leaves are alternately arranged, simple, 2–7 centimetres (1–3 inches) long and broad, palmately lobed with five lobes. When young in spring, they have a strong resinous scent.

The flowers are produced in early spring at the same time as the leaves emerge, on dangling racemes 3–7 cm (1–3 in) long of 5–30 flowers; each flower is 5–10 millimetres (1/4–3/8 in) in diameter, with five red, pink, or white petals.

The fruit is a dark purple oval berry about 1 cm (3/8 in) long; it has an insipid taste.

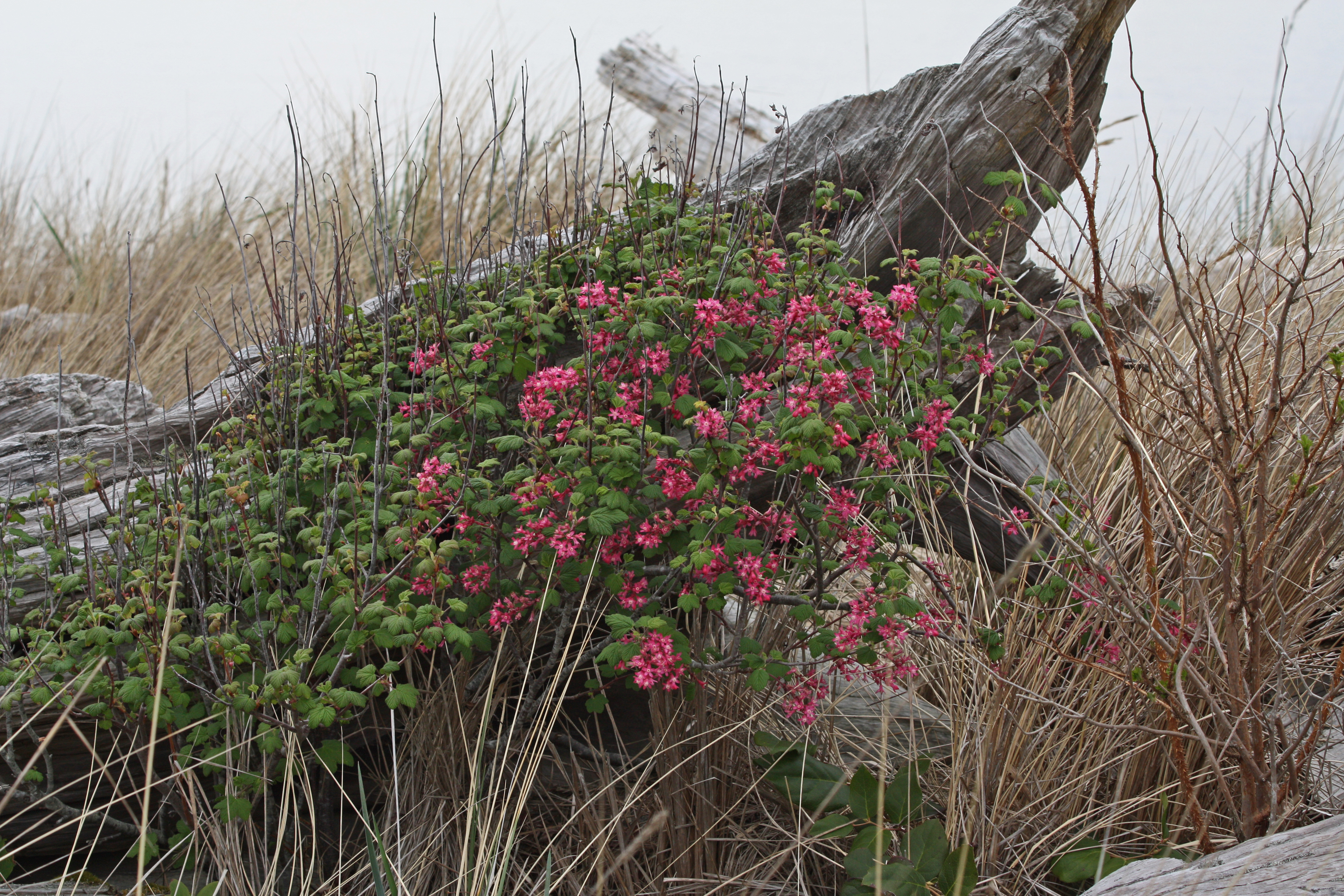
Habit

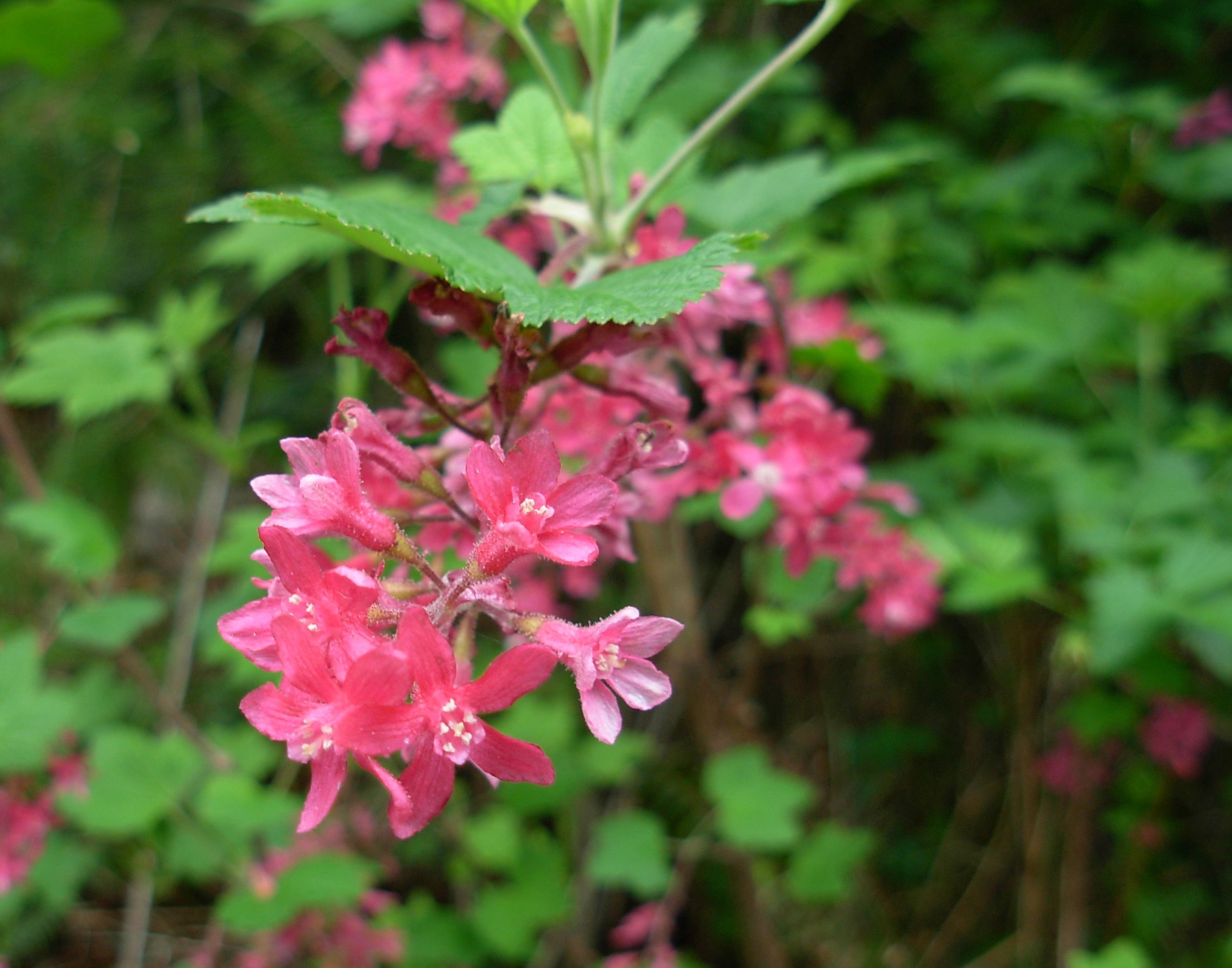
Flowers

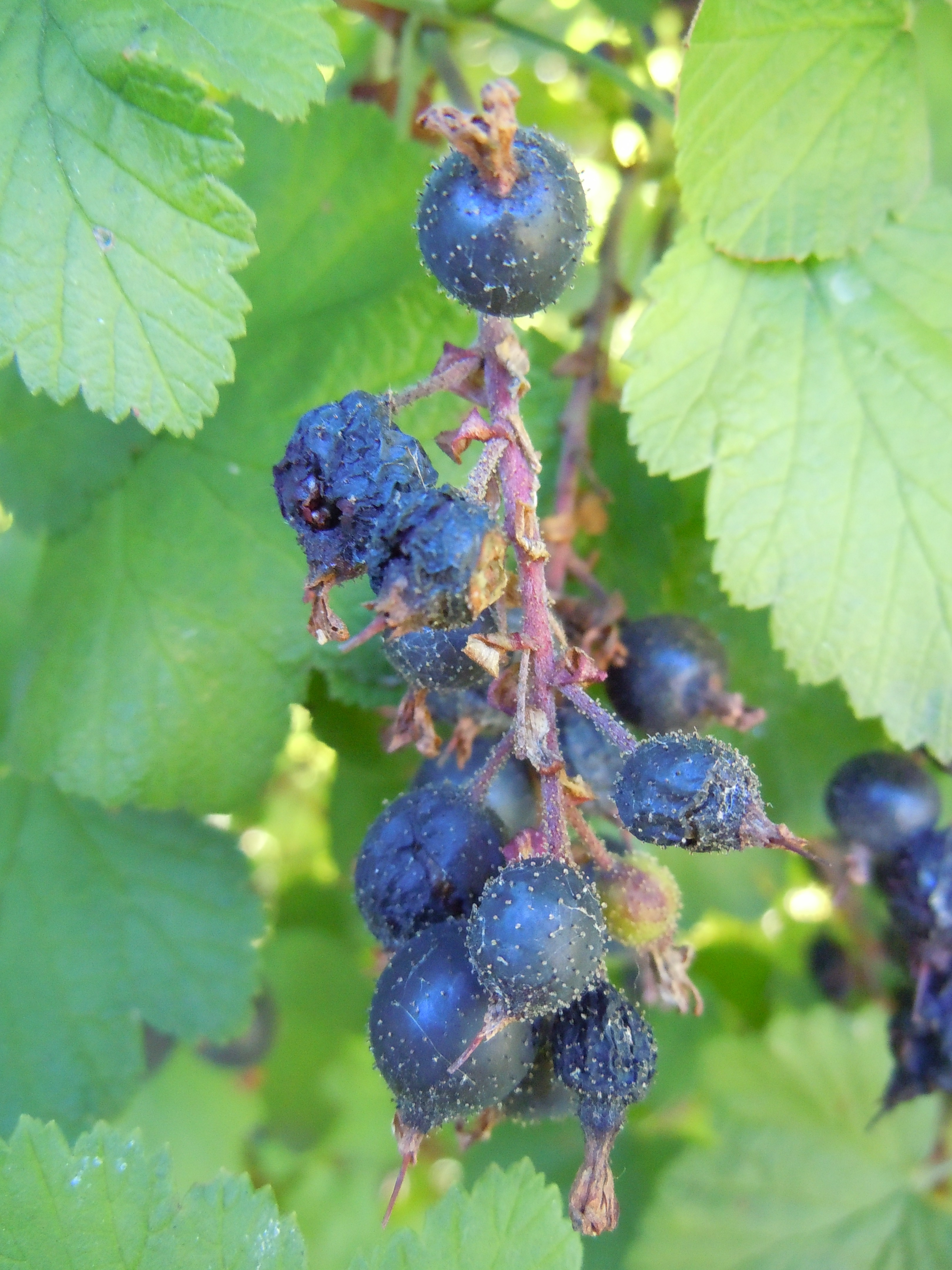
Fruits

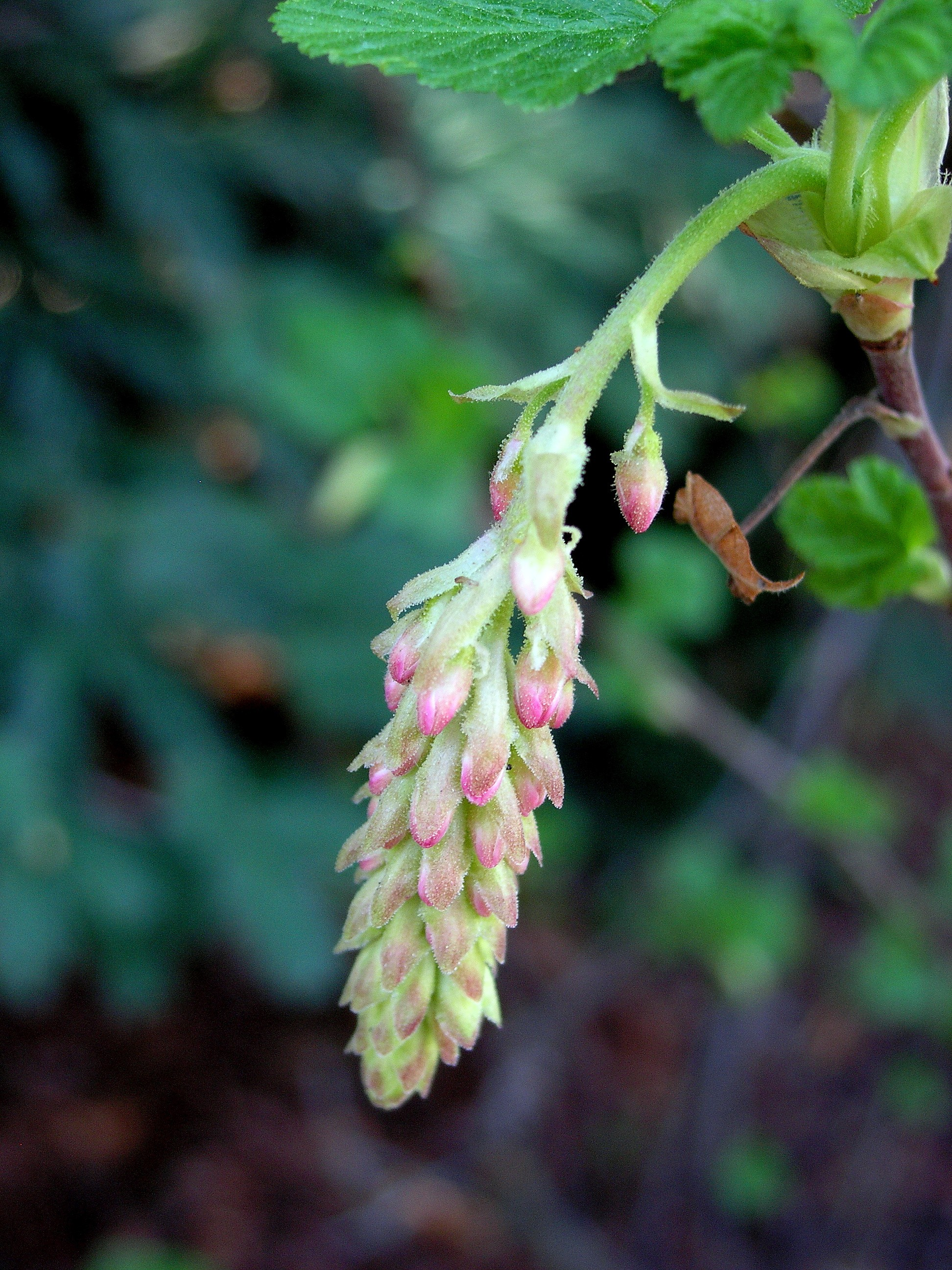
Spring buds on var. glutinosum

== Taxonomy ==
=== Varieties ===
Image	Subspecies	Description	Distribution
	Ribes sanguineum var. glutinosum	Racemes with 15–40 pendant flowers, sepals pink to white.	Oregon and California south to Santa Barbara County, and Guadalupe Island, elevations of 0–2,300 m (0–7,546 ft)
	Ribes sanguineum var. sanguineum	Racemes with 5-15(-20) erect to stiffly spreading flowers, sepals red.	California, Idaho, Oregon, and Washington, elevations of 1,300–2,400 m (4,300–7,900 ft).

=== Etymology ===
The Latin specific epithet sanguineum means 'blood-red'.

== Ecology ==
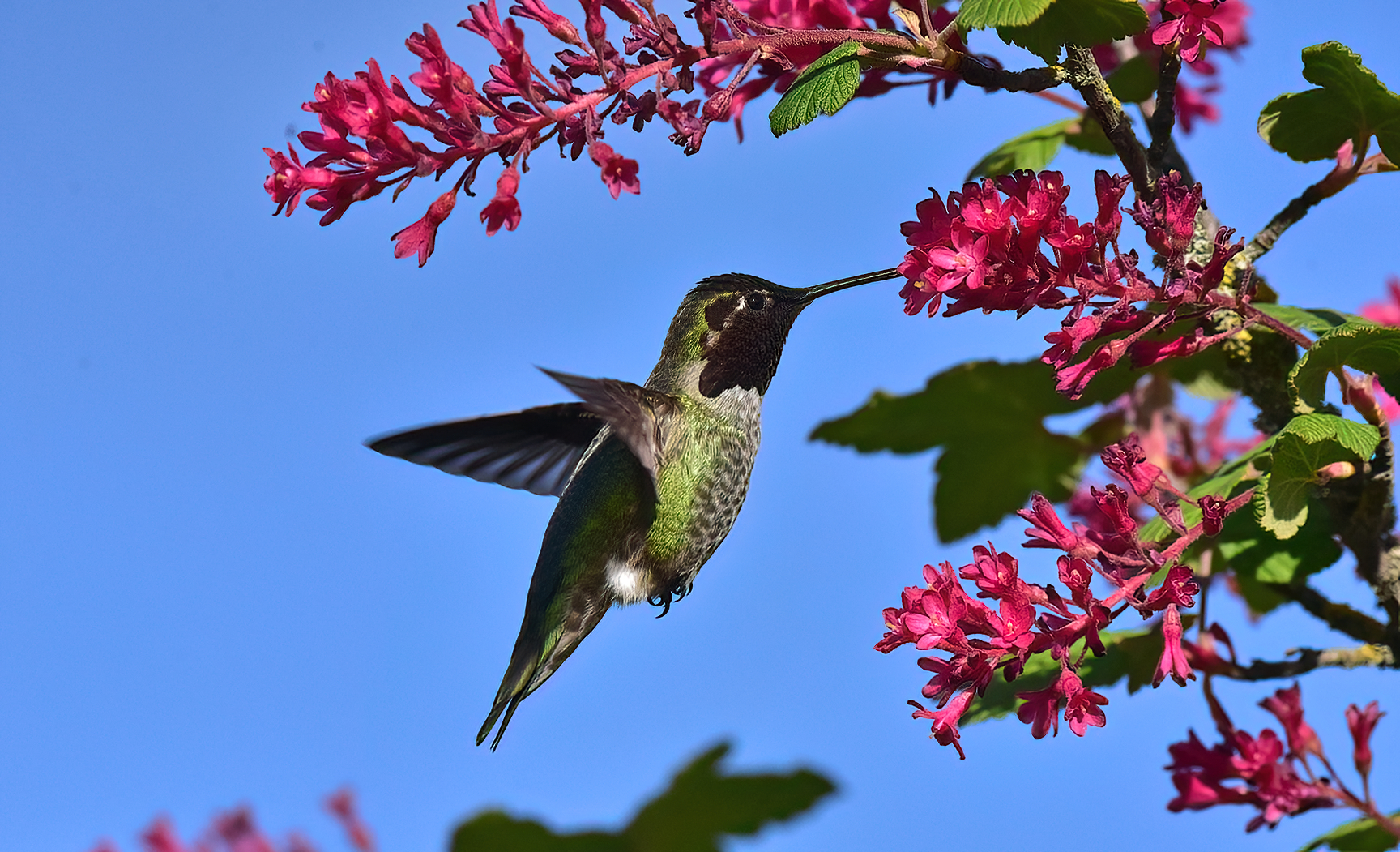
Anna's hummingbird feeding from R. sanguineum blossoms, in Vancouver

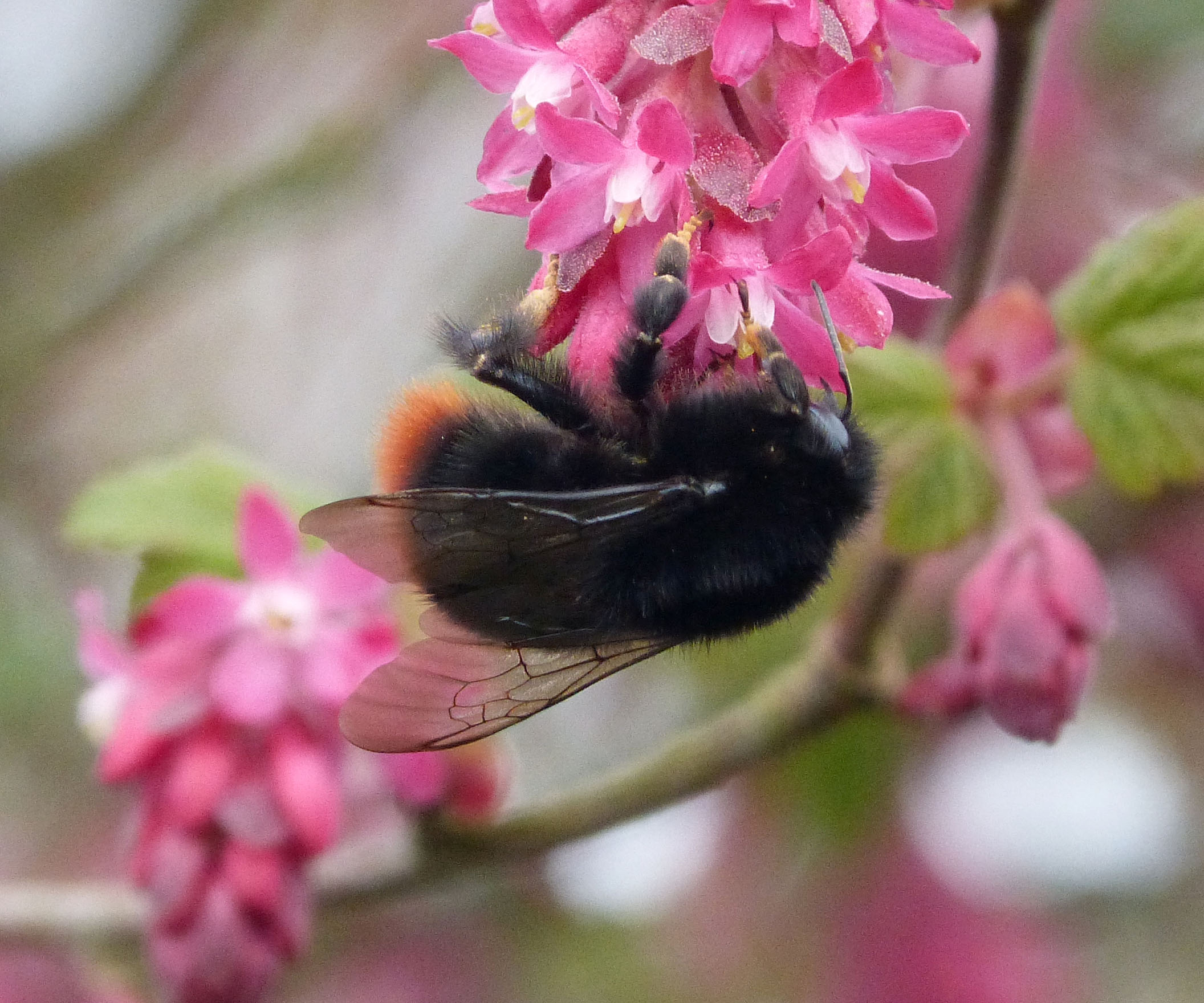
Bumblebee on flowers

The early spring nectar of red-flowering currant is used by hummingbirds as well as butterflies, which along with moths browse the leaves in their larval stage. Deer and elk occasionally browse the leaves, and the berries are consumed by birds and small mammals. Its branches provide nesting habitat for birds.

The species is a host to white pine blister rust, which led to eradication efforts in the early to mid-20th century. From the 1920s the genus Ribes was federally restricted within the United States until the ban was lifted in 1966 due to increased resistance among both Ribes and Western white pine populations.

Red-flowering currant is shade tolerant but prefers sunny sites. It tolerates drought well, but prefers cool and moist conditions.

=== As an invasive species ===
Red-flowering currant has been an invasive species in New Zealand since it was naturalized in 1904, where it forms dense stands in shrublands and along waterways which crowd out native vegetation.

It is considered a 'significant environmental weed' in Tasmania, though only a minor problem as it is not widespread.

== Cultivation ==
R. sanguineum was introduced into cultivation in Britain in the fall of 1826 by Scottish botanist David Douglas, via seeds he had sent back during his explorations for the Royal Horticultural Society in the Pacific Northwest. It and its varieties and cultivars became immediately popular among English gardeners. The noted botanist and RHS member John Lindley remarked:

...of such importance do we consider [red-flowering currant] to the embellishment of our gardens, that if the expense incurred by the Horticultural Society in Mr. Douglas' voyage had been attended with no other result than the introduction of this species, there would have been no ground for dissatisfaction.

— John Lindley, quoted in The Collector by Jack Nisbet

It remains a popular garden shrub, valued for its brightly colored and scented flowers in early spring, and birds and habitat support. Numerous cultivars have been selected with flowers ranging from white to dark red. The following cultivars have gained the Royal Horticultural Society’s Award of Garden Merit:

- 'Koja'
- 'Poky's Pink'
- White Icicle = 'Ubric'

== Uses ==
The berries are edible but of poor flavour.

Both indigenous and non-indigenous people use the berries for food, eating them fresh or dried or making them into jams, pies, juice, or syrup. The flowers can be used to infuse beverages, especially spirits.
