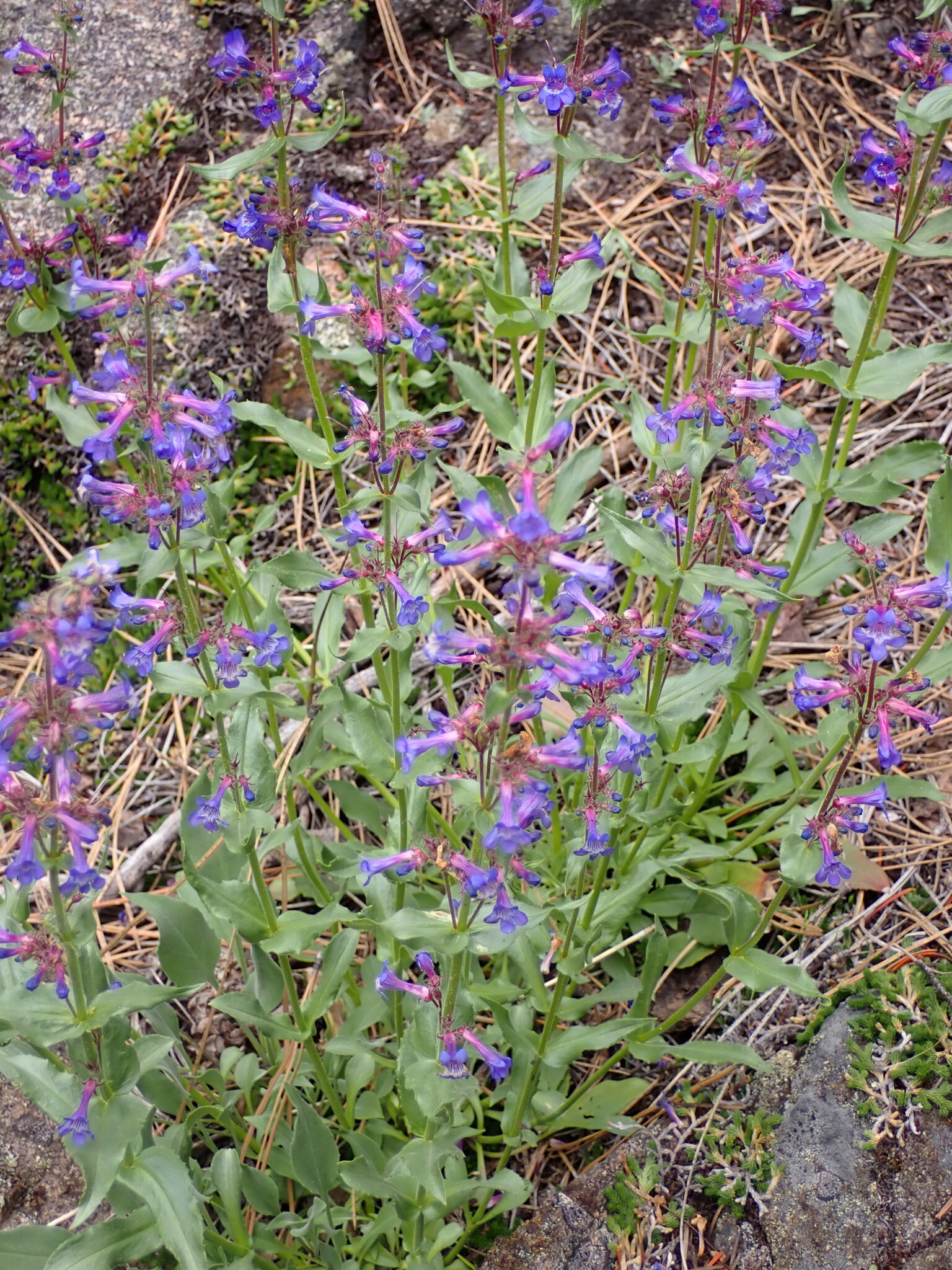

Conservation status
- Apparently Secure (NatureServe)

Scientific classification
- Kingdom: Plantae
- Clade: Tracheophytes
- Clade: Angiosperms
- Clade: Eudicots
- Clade: Asterids
- Order: Lamiales
- Family: Plantaginaceae
- Genus: Penstemon
- Species: P. pruinosus

Binomial name
- Penstemon pruinosus Douglas, 1829

= Penstemon pruinosus =

Plant species in the plantain family

Penstemon pruinosus is a species of flowering plant in the plantain family; its common name is the Chelan penstemon. It is native to Washington State and southern British Columbia on the east side of the Cascade Mountains.

== Description ==
Penstemon pruinosus usually grows 8–40 centimeters (3–16 in) tall, but may occasionally grow as tall as 60 cm (24 in). The stems and basal leaves sprout from a stout branched woody base. At the base of the plant, the elliptic to ovate leaves may be up 10 cm (4 in) long and 2 cm (3/4 in) wide and born on long petioles. The flowering stem also has pairs of similar but smaller leaves that lack a petiole and clasp the stem. Both types of leaves usually have many small sharp teeth, but sometimes the teeth are obscure or missing on some leaves. The stem, flower calyx, and bases of the petals have short glandular hairs, but the leaves can be either glandular, hairy, or glabrous. The tubular blue flowers are born in separated whorls (verticillasters) and are marked with lines on the lower part of the throat. The petals' lobes vary from pale to deep blue and basal to the lobes the color often has a purple to violet tone.

== Taxonomy ==
Penstemon pruinosus was scientifically described and named by the botanist David Douglas in 1829. The specimen described by Douglas was collected near the Priest Rapids on the Columbia River.

== Distribution and habitat ==
Penstemon pruinosus is found in open areas in central Washington and south-central British Columbia in a variety of open habitats from lower elevations to low mountains. It grows in arid habitats with sagebrush or pine trees from 300 to 2,000 meters (1,000 to 6,600 ft).

== See also ==
List of Penstemon species

== Gallery ==
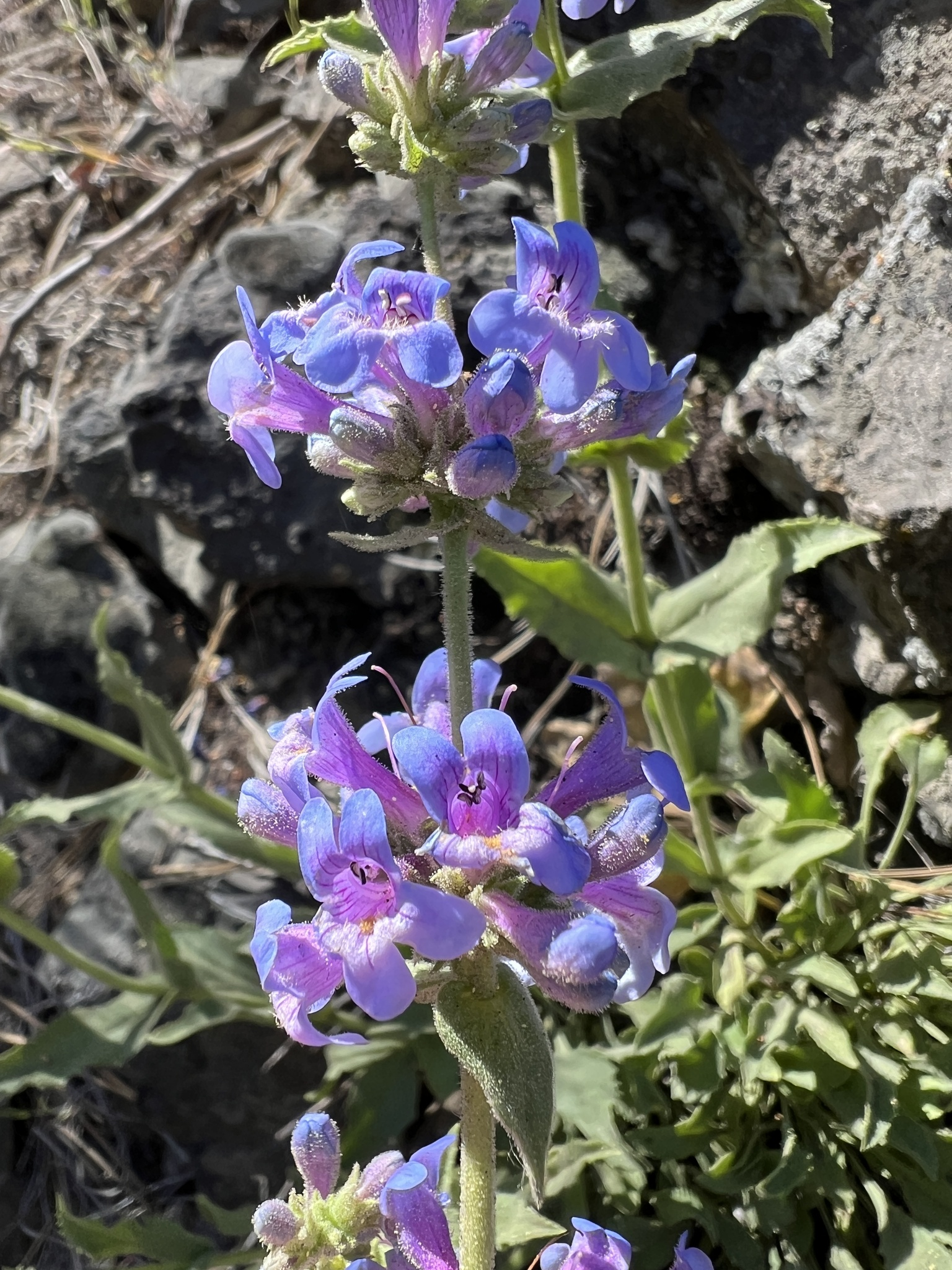
Flowers

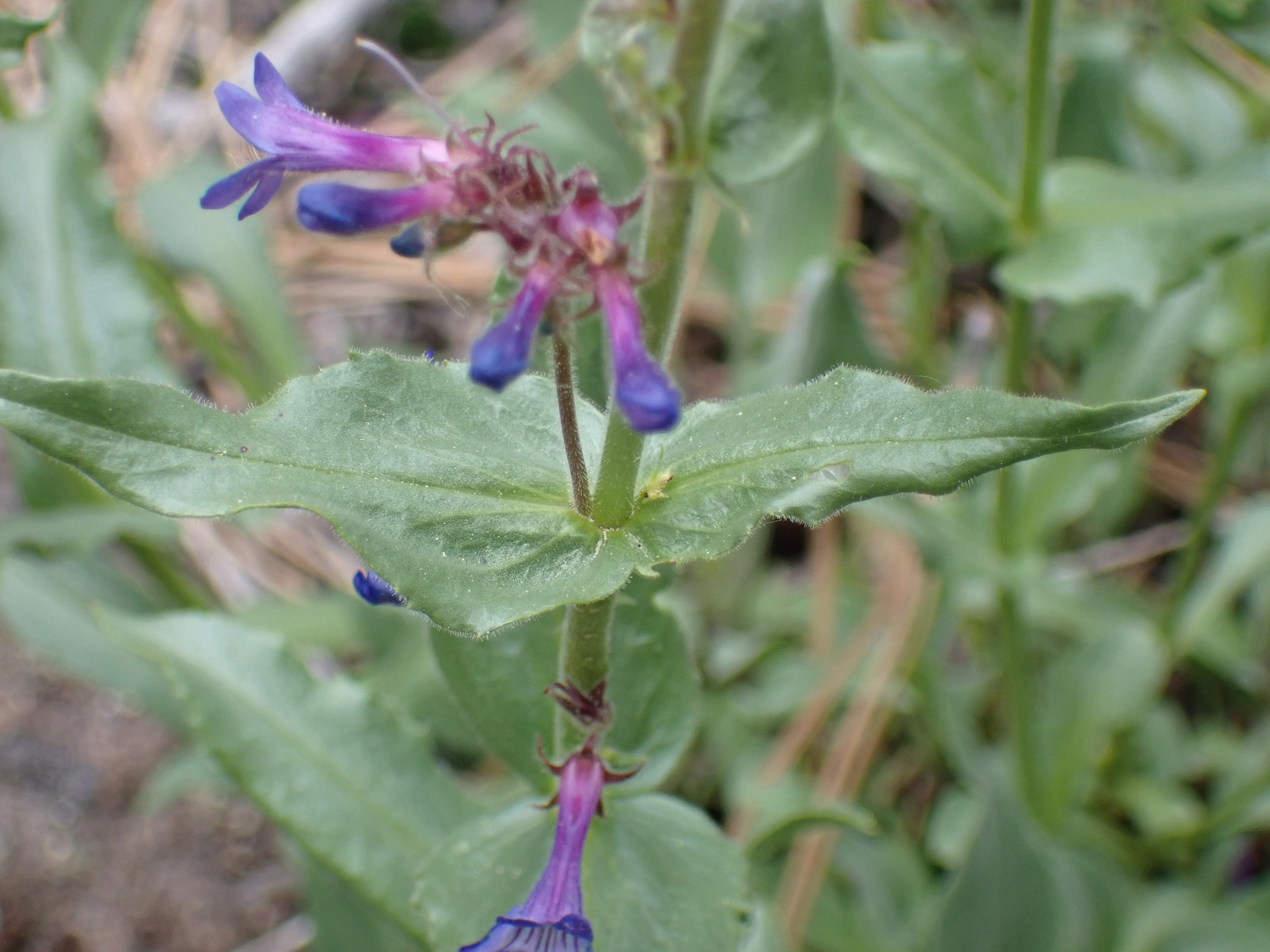
Stem leaves

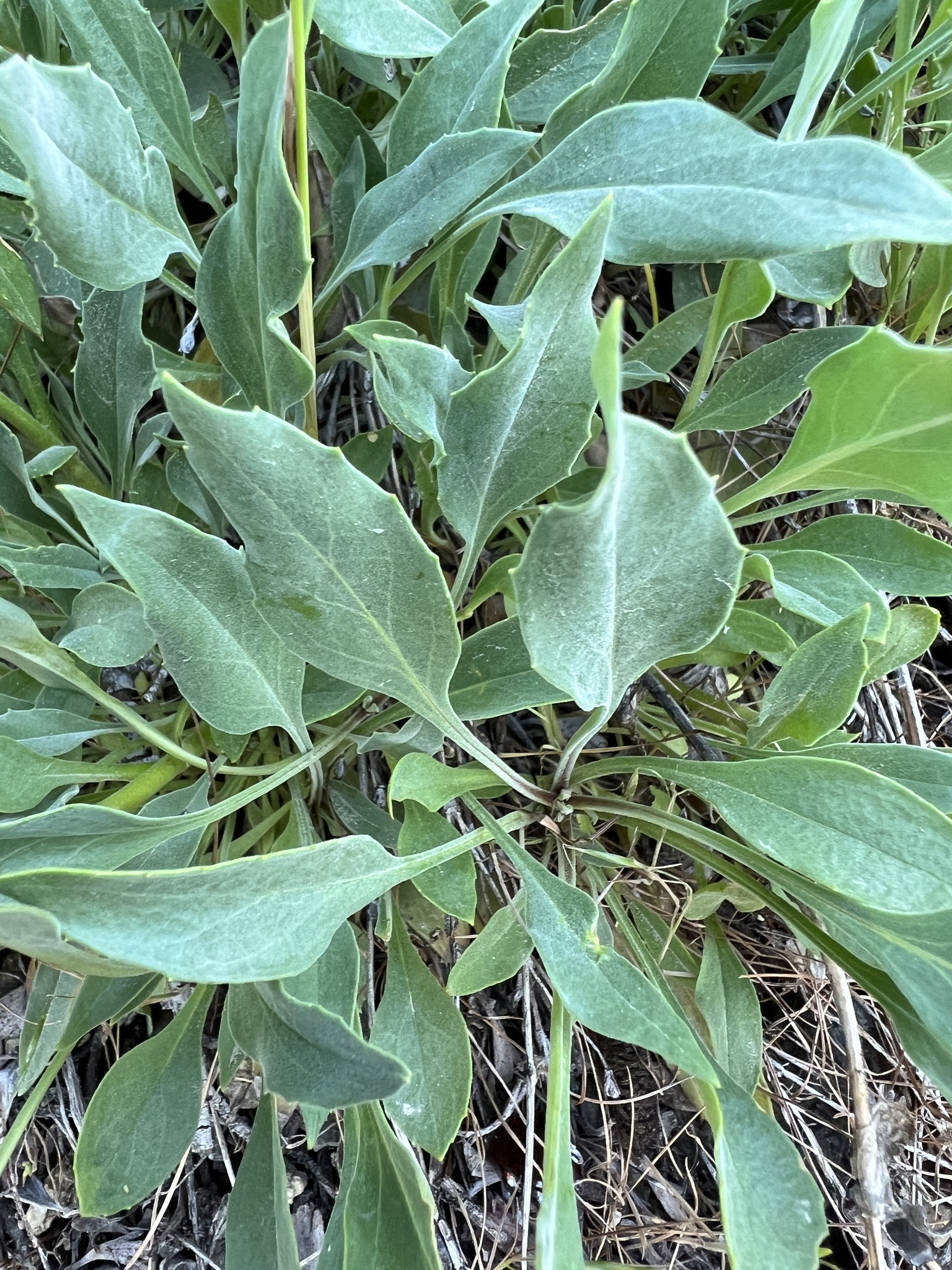
Basal leaves
