= Kirkby Glacier =

Glacier in Antarctica

- Location within Antarctica
- Type: Outlet glacier
- Location: East Antarctica
- Coordinates: 70°43′S 166°9′E
- Terminus: Southern Ocean

Kirkby Glacier (70°43′S 166°9′E) is a glacier, 20 nautical miles (37 km; 23 mi) in length, that drains the central Anare Mountains of Antarctica and flows northwest to the sea just north of Arthurson Bluff, northern Victoria Land.

== Name ==
Kirkby Glacier was named by the Australian National Antarctic Research Expeditions (ANARE) for Sydney L. Kirkby, a surveyor on the ANARE Thala Dan cruise of 1962, led by Phillip Law, which explored the area along this coast.

== Location ==
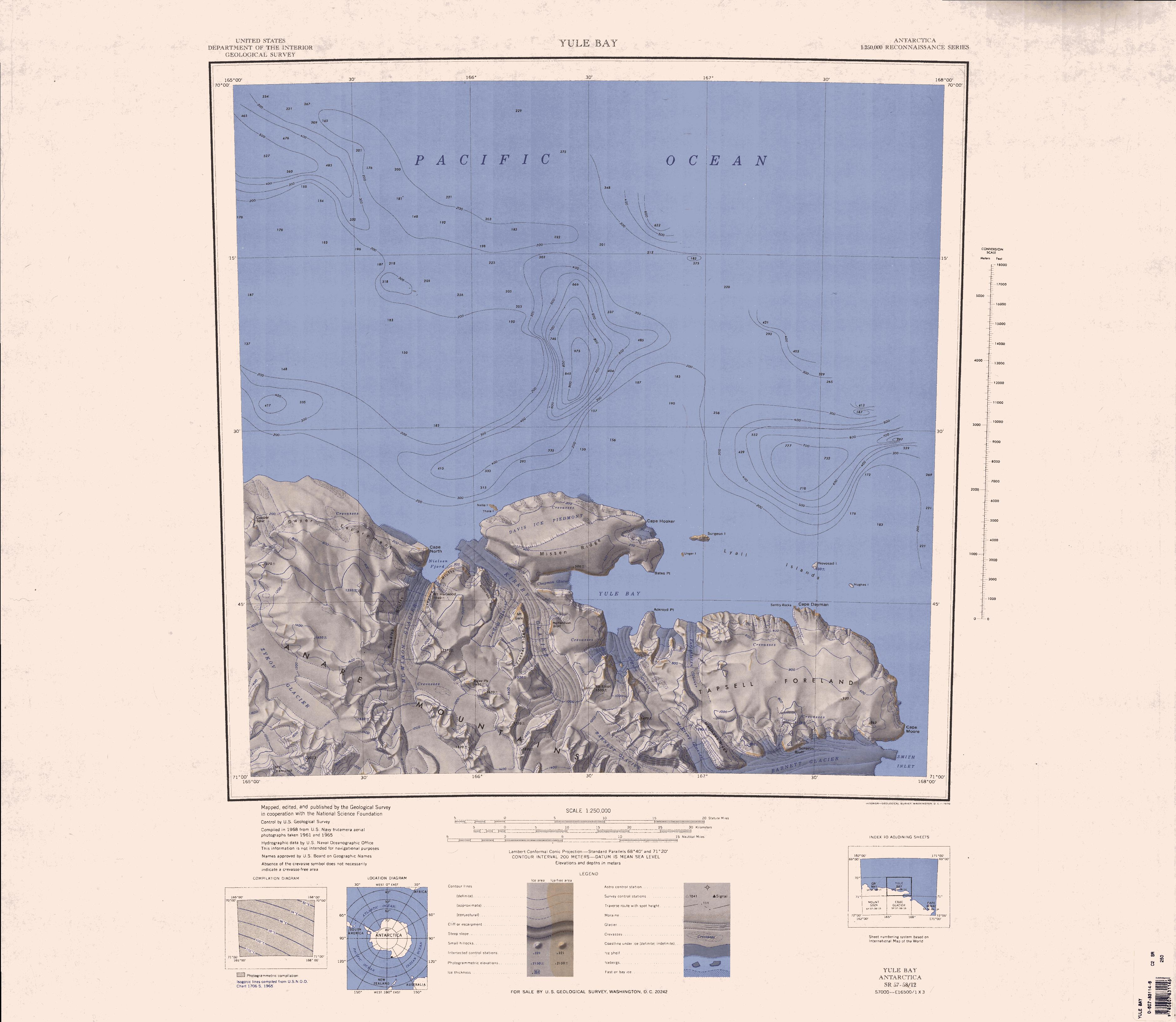
McMahon Glacier towards the west on the coast

The Kirkby Glacier forms in the Anare Mountains to the west of the head of Barnett Glacier. It flows north past Mount Elliot and Richardson Bluff to the east, and Frecker Ridge to the west, which terminates in Mount Gale. The Ludvig Glacier joins it from the west where it flows past Arthurson Bluff. To the south of Missen Ridge the Chapman Glacier flows east from the Kirkby Glacier to Yule Bay. The Kirkby Glacier continues northwest to enter the Pacific Ocean just east of Nielsen Fjord, and west of Davis Ice Piedmont.

== Features ==
=== Richardson Bluff ===
70°47′S 166°20′E. A steep rock bluff which rises on the east side of Kirkby Glacier opposite Frecker Ridge. Named by ANARE for Sergeant A. Richardson, member of the Antarctic Flight RAAF which accompanied the ANARE Thala Dan cruise to this coast, 1962.

=== Frecker Ridge ===
70°49′S 166°13′E. A ridge that rises abruptly along the west side of Kirkby Glacier. It is 5 nautical miles (9.3 km; 5.8 mi) long and terminates in the north at Mount Gale. Named by ANARE for Sergeant R. Frecker, RAAF, a member of the Antarctic Flight with the ANARE Thala Dan cruise that explored this coast, 1962.

=== Mount Gale ===
70°46′S 166°12′E. A promontory at the north end of Frecker Ridge. It stands at the south side of the confluence of Ludvig Glacier and Kirkby Glacier. Named by ANCA for Commander d'A.T. Gale, formerly of the RAN, hydrographic surveyor with the ANARE Thala Dan cruise that explored this coast, 1962.

=== Ludvig Glacier ===
70°45′S 166°09′E. Tributary glacier draining north between Arthurson Bluff and Mount Gale to join Kirkby Glacier near the coast. Named by ANARE for Ludvig Larsen, chief officer of the ship Thala Dan in which ANARE explored this coast, 1962.

=== Arthurson Bluff ===
70°45′S 166°05′E. A mostly ice-covered bluff overlooking the confluence of Ludvig Glacier and Kirkby Glacier from the west, near the coast. A helicopter landing was made here by an ANARE party led by Phillip Law, 1962. Named by ANARE for Captain J. Arthurson, helicopter pilot with the expedition.

== Sources ==
- Alberts, Fred G., ed. (1995), Geographic Names of the Antarctic (PDF) (2 ed.), United States Board on Geographic Names This article incorporates public domain material from websites or documents of the United States Board on Geographic Names.
- Wilson, David (1991). Alfresco flight: The RAAF Antarctic experience (PDF). Point Cook, Victoria, Australia: Royal Australian Air Force Museum. pp. 64–85, 121, 129. ISBN 0-642-10522-7. Archived (PDF) from the original on 25 October 2023.
- Yule Bay, USGS: United States Geographic Board

This article incorporates public domain material from websites or documents of the United States Geological Survey.
