= Lyall Islands =

Group of four islands outside the entrance to Yule Bay, Victoria Land, Antarctica

- Location within Antarctica

Geography
- Location: Pacific Ocean
- Coordinates: 70.6833°S 167.3333°E

Lyall Islands (70.6833°S 167.3333°E) is a group of four islands, Unger Island, Surgeon Island, Novosad Island and Hughes Island, lying just outside the entrance to Yule Bay, Victoria Land, Antarctica.

== Exploration and naming ==
The Lyall Islands were discovered by Captain James Clark Ross, 1841, who named the group for David Lyall (1817–1895), MD, RN, FLS, Assistant Surgeon on the Terror. In keeping with this, the United States Advisory Committee on Antarctic Names (US-ACAN) has named some of the individual islands and nearby features for surgeons who have worked in Antarctica.

== Location ==
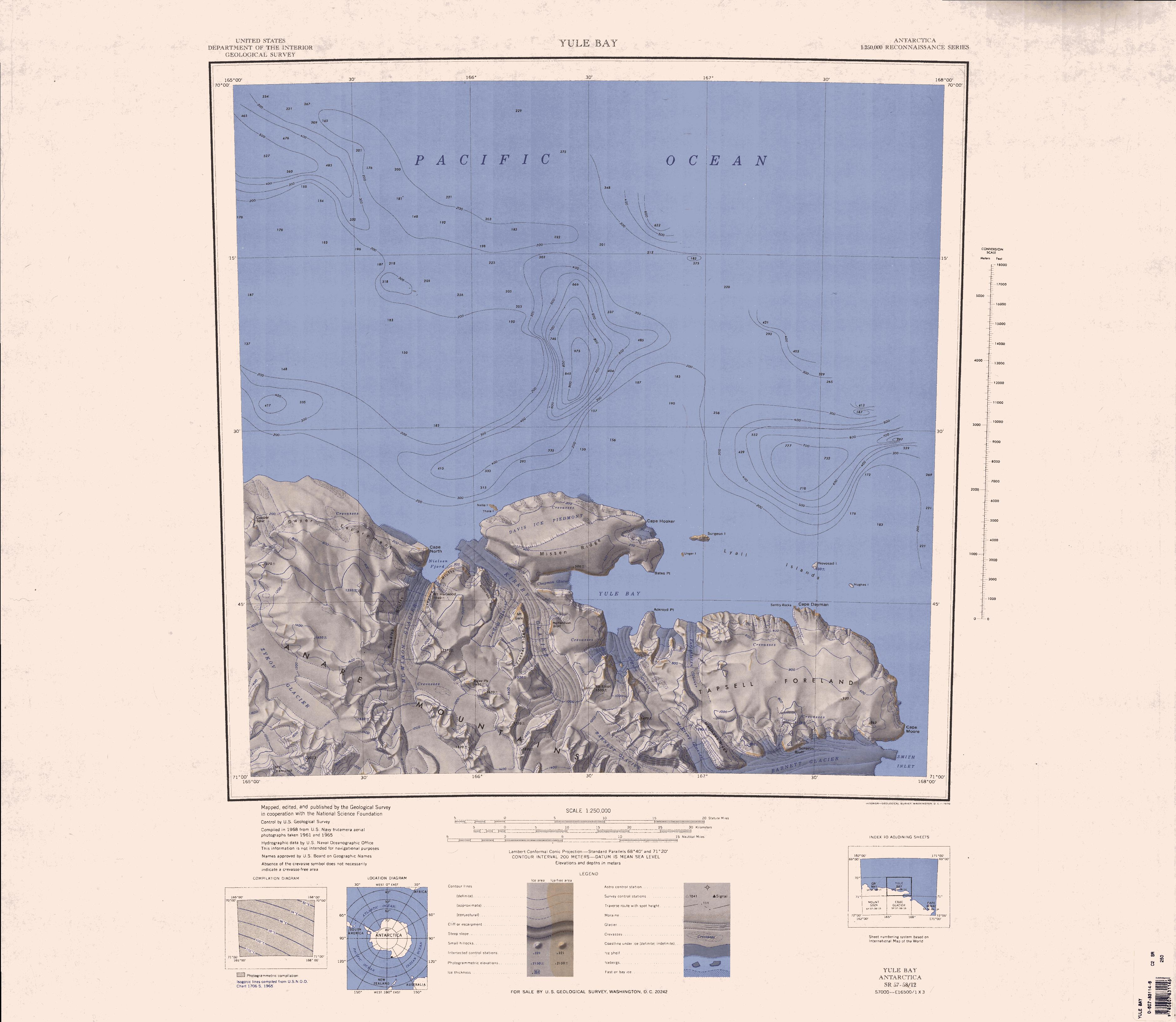
Lyall Islands east of Yule Bay in the center

The Lyall Islands are in the Pacific Ocean to the north of Tapsell Foreland and east of Yule Bay and the Davis Ice Piedmont. From west to east they are Unger Island, Surgeon Island, Novosad Island and Hughes Island.

== Islands ==
=== Unger Island ===
70°41′S 166°55′E. A small, ice-free island, the westernmost of the Lyall Islands, lying 4 nautical miles (7.4 km; 4.6 mi) southeast of Cape Hooker in the west side of the entrance to Yule Bay. Mapped by the United States Geological Survey (USGS) from surveys and United States Navy air photos, 1960-63. Named by the United States Advisory Committee on Antarctic Names (US-ACAN) for Lieutenant Pat B. Unger, United States Navy Reserve, Medical Officer at Little America V, 1957.

=== Surgeon Island ===
70°40′S 166°59′E. The largest of the Lyall Islands, lying 4 nautical miles (7.4 km; 4.6 mi) east-southeast of Cape Hooker off the north coast of Victoria Land. Mapped by USGS from surveys and United States Navy air photos, 1960-63. The toponym conforms to other names in the island group which, along with Cape Hooker, have been named after surgeons who have worked in Antarctica. Named by the US-ACAN.

=== Novosad Island ===
70°42′S 167°29′E. A small, ice-covered island, one of the Lyall Islands, lying 4 nautical miles (7.4 km; 4.6 mi) north-northeast of Cape Dayman. Mapped by USGS from surveys and United States Navy air photos, 1960-63. Named by US-ACAN for Lieutenant Charles L. Novosad, Jr., United States Navy, Medical Officer at the Naval Air Facility, McMurdo Sound, 1957.

=== Hughes Island ===
70°44′S 167°39′E. A small ice-covered island, the easternmost of the Lyall Islands, lying just outside the east part of the entrance to Yule Bay. Mapped by USGS from surveys and United States Navy air photos, 1960-63. Named by US-ACAN for Lieutenant Ronald M. Hughes, United States Navy, Medical Officer at McMurdo Station, 1966.

== Sources ==
- Alberts, Fred G., ed. (1995), Geographic Names of the Antarctic (PDF) (2 ed.), United States Board on Geographic Names This article incorporates public domain material from websites or documents of the United States Board on Geographic Names.
- Yule Bay, USGS: United States Geographic Board

This article incorporates public domain material from websites or documents of the United States Geological Survey.
