= Hookah (disambiguation) =

A hookah is an instrument for vaporizing and smoking flavored tobacco or sometimes cannabis or opium.

Hookah may also refer to:

- "Hookah" (Tyga song), 2014
- "Hookah" (Bad Gyal song), 2019
- A basic form of surface-supplied diving

== See also ==
- Hooker (disambiguation)
- əkoostik hookah, a Columbus, Ohio jam band, hosts of the Hookahville music festival
- Hookah lounge, an establishment where patrons share hookah
- Muʽassel, or shisha
