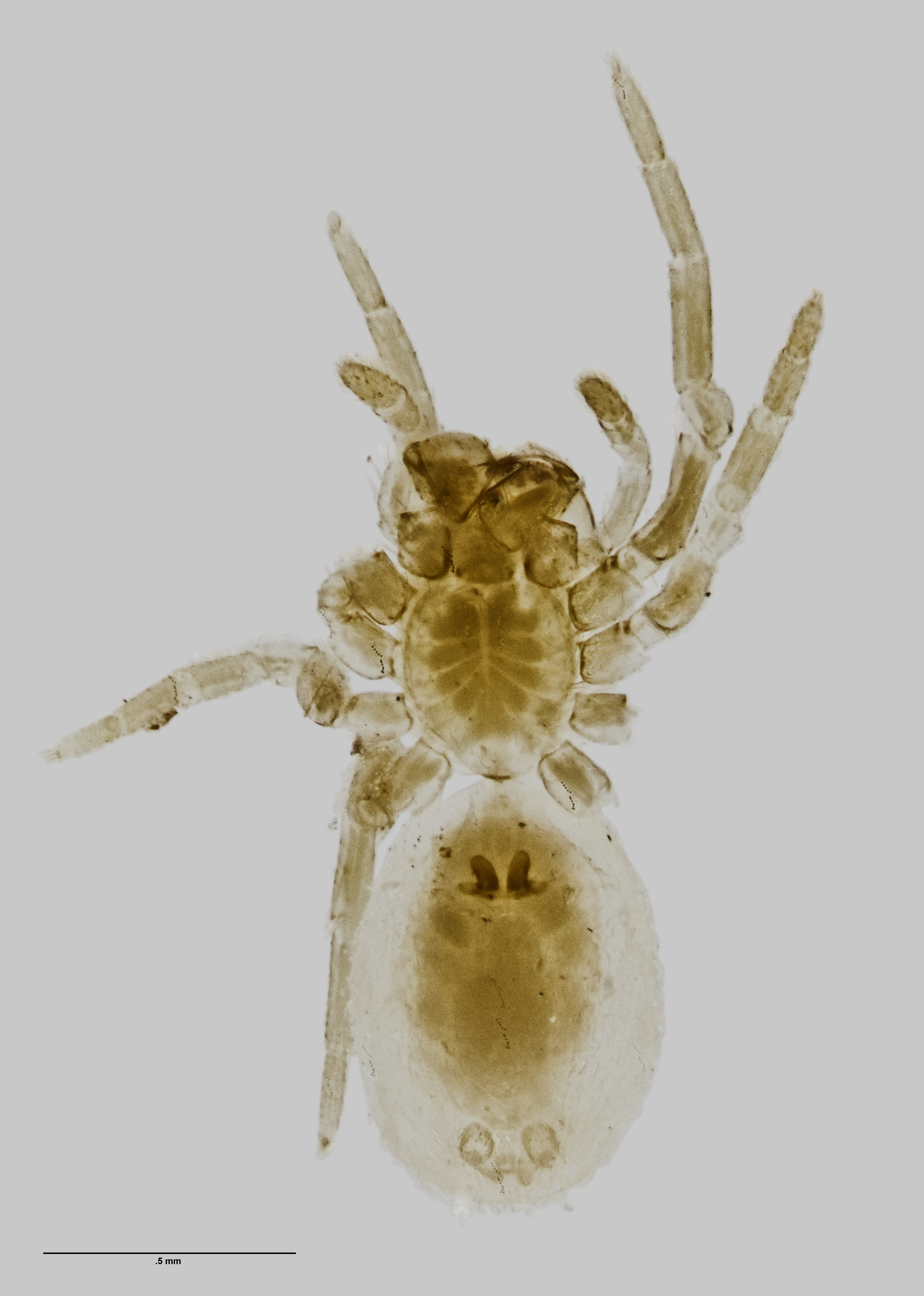

Conservation status
- Data Deficit (NZ TCS)

Scientific classification
- Kingdom: Animalia
- Phylum: Arthropoda
- Subphylum: Chelicerata
- Class: Arachnida
- Order: Araneae
- Infraorder: Araneomorphae
- Family: Agelenidae
- Genus: Huka
- Species: H. alba

Binomial name
- Huka alba Forster & Wilton, 1973

= Huka alba =

Species of spider

Huka alba is a species of Agelenidae that is endemic to New Zealand.

== Taxonomy ==
This species was described in 1973 by Ray Forster and Cecil Wilton from female specimens. The holotype is stored in Auckland War Memorial Museum under registration number AMNZ5057.

== Description ==
The female is recorded at 1.2mm in length. The cephalothorax and legs are coloured straw yellow. The abdomen is creamy.

== Distribution ==
This species is only known from the North Island Volcanic Plateau and the Waikaremoana region in New Zealand.

== Conservation status ==
Under the New Zealand Threat Classification System, this species is listed as "Data Deficient" with the qualifiers of "Data Poor: Size" and "Data Poor: Trend".
