= David Douglas (botanist) =

Scottish botanist (1799–1834)

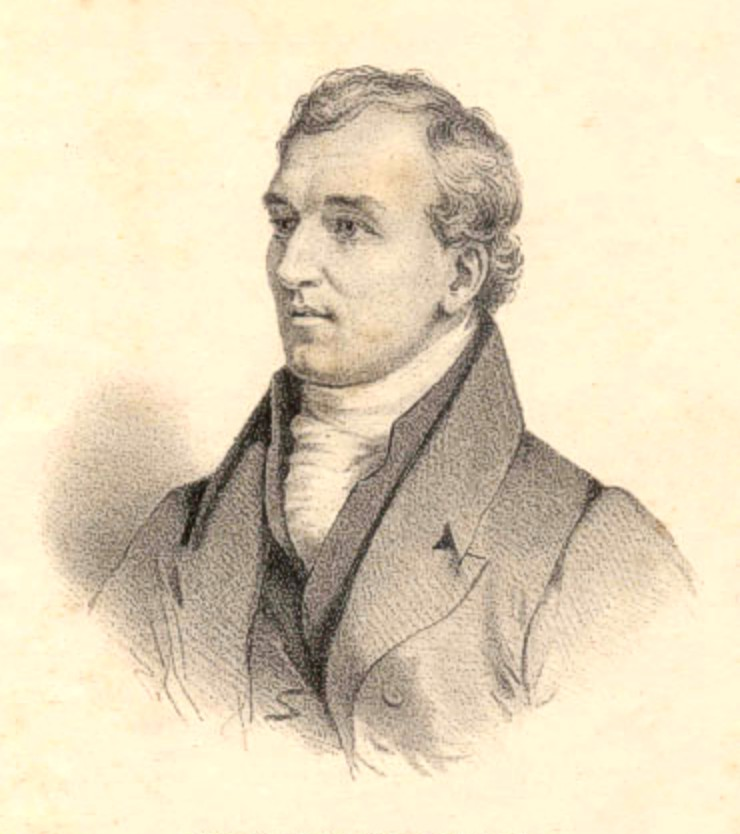
- Born: 25 June 1799; Scone, Perthshire, Scotland
- Died: 12 July 1834 (aged 35); Mauna Kea, Laupāhoehoe, Hawai'i
- Resting place: Honolulu, Hawaii
- Education: University of Glasgow
- Known for: Douglas fir
- Scientific career
- Fields: Botany
- Workplaces: Glasgow Botanic Gardens, Royal Horticultural Society
- Author abbrev. (botany): Douglas

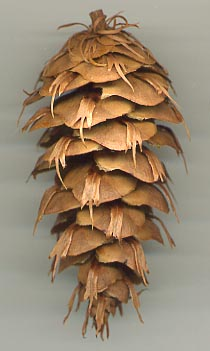
Coast Douglas-fir cone, from a tree grown from seed collected by David Douglas in 1826

David Douglas (25 June 1799 – 12 July 1834) was a Scottish botanist, best known as the namesake of the Douglas fir. He worked as a gardener, and explored the Scottish Highlands, North America and Hawaii, where he died. The standard author abbreviation Douglas is used to indicate this person as the author when citing a botanical name.

== Early life ==
Douglas was born in Scone, Perthshire, the second son of John Douglas, a stonemason, and Jean Drummond. At around the age of seven, he attended a school in a neighboring parish, where he became known for his tardiness and truancy, preferring to explore the countryside during his two-mile walk to class. He attended school in Kinnoull, on the eastern banks of the River Tay, and upon leaving found work as an apprentice to William Beattie, head gardener at nearby Scone Palace, the seat of the Earl of Mansfield. He spent seven years in this position, completing his apprenticeship, and then spent a winter at a college in Perth to learn more of the scientific and mathematical aspects of plant culture. After a further spell of working at Valleyfield House in Fife (during which time he had access to a library of botanical and zoological books), he moved to the Botanical Gardens of Glasgow University and attended botany lectures. William Jackson Hooker, who was Garden Director and Professor of Botany, was greatly impressed with him and took him on an expedition to the Scottish Highlands before recommending him to the Royal Horticultural Society as a plant collector.

== Explorations ==
Douglas made three separate trips from Britain to North America. His first, to eastern North America, began on 3 June 1823, with a return in the late autumn of 1823. The second was to the Pacific Northwest, from July 1824 returning October 1827. (Note: He sailed aboard William and Ann, which the Hudson's Bay Company had purchased to explore the Pacific Northwest.) His third and final trip started in England in October 1829. On that last journey he went first to the Columbia River, then to San Francisco, then in August 1832, to Hawaii. In October 1832, he returned to the Columbia River region. A year later, in October 1833, he returned to Hawaii, arriving on 2 January 1834. The second expedition starting in 1824 was his most successful. The Royal Horticultural Society sent him back on a plant-hunting expedition in the Pacific Northwest that ranks among the great botanical explorations.

In the spring of 1826, David Douglas was compelled to climb a peak (Mount Brown, of the mythical pair Hooker and Brown) near Athabasca Pass to take in the view. In so doing, he was perhaps one of the first Europeans to be a "mountaineer" in North America. He introduced the Douglas fir (Douglas-fir) into cultivation in 1827. Other notable introductions include Sitka spruce, sugar pine, western white pine, ponderosa pine, lodgepole pine, Monterey pine, grand fir, noble fir and several other conifers that transformed the British landscape and timber industry, as well as numerous garden shrubs and herbs such as the flowering currant, salal, lupin, penstemon and California poppy. His success was well beyond expectations; in one of his letters to Hooker, he wrote "you will begin to think I manufacture pines at my pleasure". Altogether he introduced about 240 species of plants to Britain.

He first briefly visited Hawaii in 1830 on his way to the Pacific Northwest. He returned again in December 1833 intending to spend three months of winter there. He was only the second European to reach the summit of the Mauna Loa volcano.

== Death ==
Douglas died under mysterious circumstances while climbing Mauna Kea in Hawaii at the age of 35 in 1834. He apparently fell into a pit trap where he was mauled to death by a bull. He was last seen alive at the hut of Englishman Edward "Ned" Gurney, a bullock hunter and escaped convict. Gurney was suspected in Douglas's death, as Douglas was said to have been carrying more money than Gurney subsequently delivered with the body; others suggested he might have been robbed and murdered by two native Hawaiians. However, no evidence was found to contradict Gurney's story. In 1856, a marker to Douglas was erected on an outside wall at Kawaiahaʻo Church (Kawaiahao Church Cemetery). A monument was built, at the spot where Douglas died, by members of the Hilo Burns Society, including David McHattie Forbes. It is called Ka lua kauka ("Doctor's Pit" in the Hawaiian language), off Mānā Road on the Island of Hawaiʻi (19°53′17″N 155°20′17″W). A small stand of Douglas fir trees has been planted there.

== Legacy ==
Although the common name "Douglas fir" refers to him, the tree's scientific name, Pseudotsuga menziesii, honours a rival botanist, Archibald Menzies. Several Hawaiian plants were named after him in earlier taxonomies, such as Pandanus tectorius known in Hawaiian as hala, sometimes given the name Pandanus douglasii. A species of "horned toad", Phrynosoma douglasii, is named in honor of David Douglas. Over eighty species of plants and animals have douglasii in their scientific names, in his honour. He introduced several hundred plants to Great Britain and hence to Europe. There is a memorial to David Douglas in his birthplace of Scone. David Douglas High School and the David Douglas School District in Portland, Oregon are named after him. Remnants of a greenhouse built by David Douglas can be seen in Wood Street Village, Surrey.

In Vancouver, Washington, he is remembered via David Douglas Park which was used during World War II as interim housing for the Kaiser Shipyard workers living in little silver trailers, giving the area the brief nickname during the era of "Trailer Terrace Park."

The David Douglas Chapter of Daughters of the American Revolution was founded in Redmond, Washington in 1981.

The actor Alvy Moore was cast as Douglas in the 1962 episode "The Grass Man" of the television series Death Valley Days.

== Writings ==
Among the written works of David Douglas are:

- Douglas, David (1914). Journal kept by David Douglas during his travels in North America 1823–1827 : together with a particular description of thirty-three species of American oaks and eighteen species of Pinus, with appendices containing a list of the plants introduced by Douglas and an account of his death in 1834. W. Wesley & Son under the direction of the Royal Horticultural Society. Available online through the Washington State Library's Classics in Washington History collection
- —— (1833). "Description of a new Species of the Genus Pinus". Transactions of the Linnean Society of London. 16: 747–749.

== Family ==
David Douglas had a son who was named David Finlay. David Finlay, who was recorded as being an interpreter, died in April 1850 at the hands of Black-feet raiders. He lived in Montana, an area where Douglas had spent long periods of time over 20 years previously, which would tie in with the age of his son, who died when he was around 22 years old. It is not known if David Douglas was aware that he had fathered a child.
