= Lander Glacier =

Glacier in Wyoming, United States

- Location within Wyoming
- Type: Mountain glacier
- Location: Fremont County, Wyoming, USA
- Coordinates: 42°52′02″N 109°19′45″W
- Area: 55 acres (22 ha)
- Length: .35 mi (0.56 km)
- Width: .25 mi (0.40 km)
- Terminus: Talus
- Status: Unknown

Lander Glacier is located in the Wind River Indian Reservation, in the U.S. state of Wyoming, .25 miles (0.40 km) WSW of Mount Lander. Lander Glacier consists of three distinct ice bodies along the north and west slopes of Mount Lander, the largest descending from the west slope, from 12,000 to 11,200 ft (3,700 to 3,400 m), immediately east of the Continental Divide.

== See also ==
- List of glaciers in the United States
