= Huka lobata =

Conservation status
- Not Threatened (NZ TCS)

Scientific classification
- Kingdom: Animalia
- Phylum: Arthropoda
- Subphylum: Chelicerata
- Class: Arachnida
- Order: Araneae
- Infraorder: Araneomorphae
- Family: Agelenidae
- Genus: Huka
- Species: H. lobata

Binomial name
- Huka lobata Forster & Wilton, 1973

Species of spider

Huka lobata is a species of Agelenidae that is endemic to New Zealand.

== Taxonomy ==
This species was described in 1973 by Ray Forster and Cecil Wilton from female specimens. The holotype is stored in Otago Museum.

== Description ==
Females measure 1.79 mm in length, with a cephalothorax and legs colored straw yellow and a creamy abdomen.

== Distribution ==
This species has been identified at various locations across New Zealand.

== Conservation status ==
Under the New Zealand Threat Classification System, this species is listed as "Not Threatened".
