= Mount Brown (British Columbia) =

Mountain in British Columbia, Canada

- Location within British Columbia
- Interactive map of Mount Brown

Highest point
- Elevation: 2,791 m (9,157 ft)
- Prominence: 513 m (1,683 ft)
- Listing: Mountains of British Columbia
- Coordinates: 52°22′49″N 118°13′48″W

Geography
- Location: British Columbia, Canada
- Parent range: Canadian Rockies
- Topo map: NTS 83D8 Athabasca Pass

Climbing
- First ascent: 1827 by David Douglas

Mount Brown is a mountain in the Canadian Rockies, located to the west of the Athabasca Pass. It was first ascended by Scottish botanist and naturalist David Douglas in 1827, who then wrote that its "height does not seem to be less than 16,000 or 17,000 feet above the level of the sea". This over-estimation of the altitude was widely accepted at the time leading to the false notion that it and the nearby Mount Hooker were the highest peaks in the Rocky Mountains (see Hooker and Brown). Douglas named the peak for Robert Brown, the first keeper at the British Museum's botanical gardens.

The southern branch of the Fraser River originates near this mountain.
