= McGillivray Ridge =

Ridge in Alberta and British Columbia, Canada

- Location within Alberta

Highest point
- Elevation: 2,697 m (8,848 ft)
- Coordinates: 52°23′30″N 118°10′30″W

Geography
- Location: Alberta; British Columbia
- Topo map: NTS 83D8 Athabasca Pass

Climbing
- First ascent: 1893 by L.Q. Coleman, L. B. Stewart

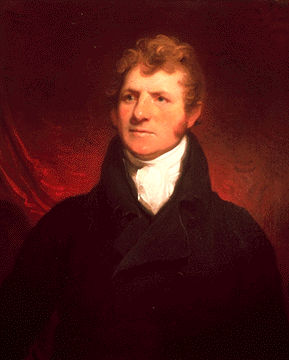
William McGillivray (1764-1825), of the North West Company, Montreal. Attributed to Sir Martin Shee, oil, 1820 (courtesy Library and Archives Canada/C-167).

McGillivray Ridge is located on the border of Alberta and British Columbia. Sometime before 1814, this massive mountain was called McGillvray's Rock after William McGillivray of the NWC.

== See also ==
- List of peaks on the Alberta–British Columbia border
- Mountains of Alberta
- Mountains of British Columbia
