= Tapsell Foreland =

Foreland in Victoria Land, Antarctica

- Location within Antarctica

Geography
- Location: Pacific Ocean
- Coordinates: 70°52′S 167°20′E

Tapsell Foreland (70°52′S 167°20′E) is a borad, mostly snow-covered foreland jutting into the sea between Yule Bay and Smith Inlet, northern Victoria Land. Much of the central portion of this feature rises above 800 metres (2,600 ft).

== Exploration and naming ==
The name Tapsell, applied by New Zealand Antarctic Place-Names Committee (NZ-APC) in 1969, is the surname of the Master of the barque Brisk, one of the whaling vessels based on Enderby Settlement at Port Ross, Auckland Islands, 1849–52. In an exploratory voyage in February 1850, Tapsell sailed south to the Balleny Islands and then west along the parallel of 67°S as far as 143°E. No land was sighted.

== Location ==
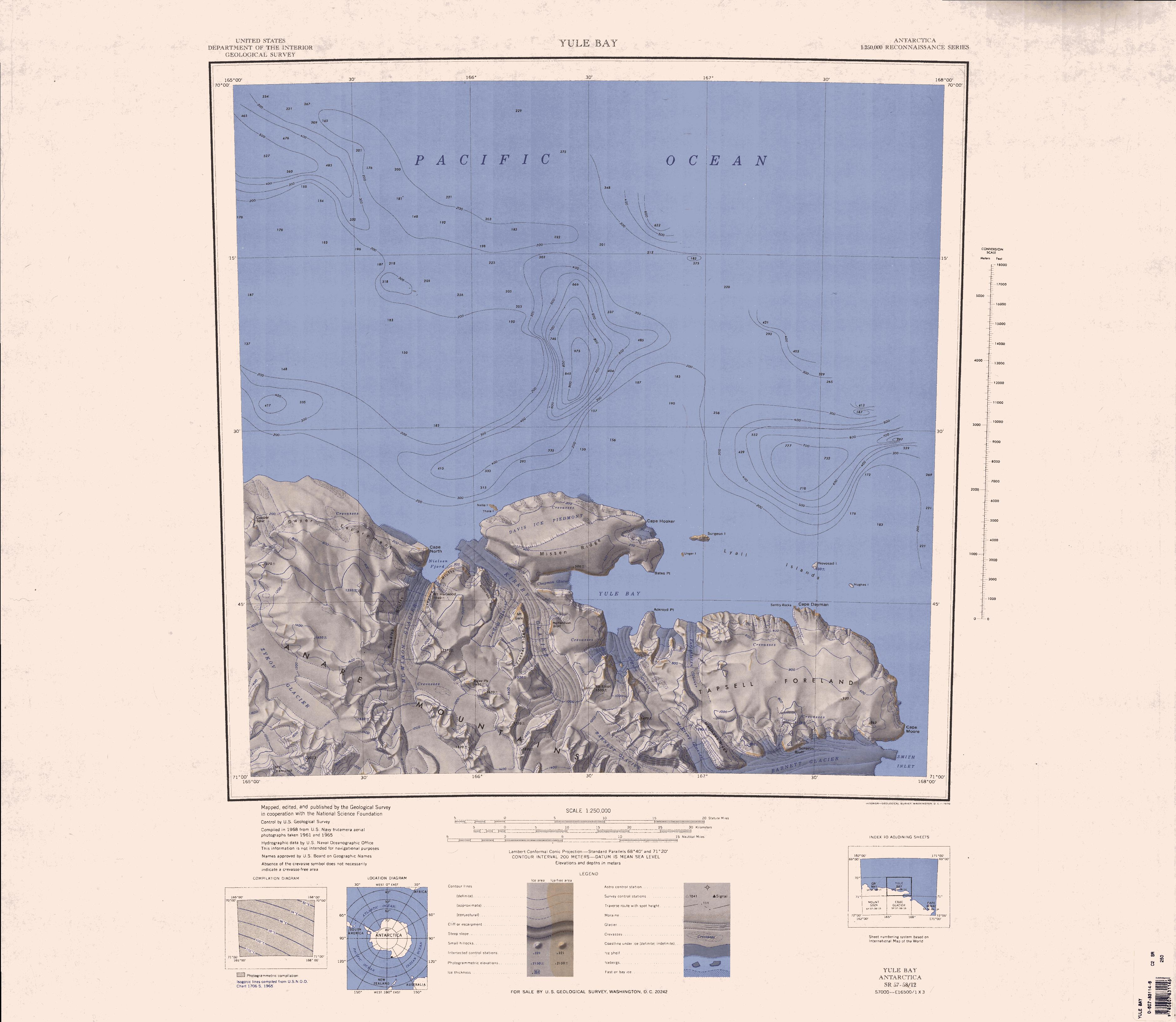
Tapsell Foreland east of center on coast

Tapsell Foreland extends eastward into the Pacific Ocean to the south of Yule Bay and the Lyall Islands, and to the north of Barnett Glacier, which empties into Smith Inlet. The Kirkby Glacier flows north past its west end. Glaciers rising on the foreland include O'Hara Glacier and Fortenberry Glacier, which flow north, and McElroy Glacier which flows south into Barnett Glacier. Other features around the coast include Ackroyd Point, Sentry Rocks, Cape Dayman, Cape Moore, Scharon Bluff and Matthews Ridge.

== Features ==
=== Fortenberry Glacier ===
70°48′S 166°57′E. A glacier on the north side of Tapsell Foreland. It flows north into Yule Bay 3 nautical miles (5.6 km; 3.5 mi) east of Ackroyd Point. Mapped by the United States Geological Survey (USGS) from surveys and United States Navy air photos, 1960-63. Named by the United States Advisory Committee on Antarctic Names (US-ACAN) for Lieutenant Ralph M. Fortenberry, United States Navy, Medical Officer at McMurdo Station, 1960.

=== Sentry Rocks ===
70°45′S 167°24′E. Two high, rugged rocks lying just off Cape Dayman. Mapped by USGS from surveys and United States Navy air photos, 1960-63. The US-ACAN applied this descriptive name which is suggestive of the position and appearance of the feature.

=== Cape Dayman ===
70°46′S 167°24′E. A cape on the north side of Tapsell Foreland that forms the south side of the entrance to Yule Bay. Discovered by Captain James Clark Ross, 1841, who named it after Joseph Dayman, mate on the ship Erebus.

=== Cape Moore ===
70°56′S 167°54′E. A cape at the east end of Tapsell Foreland which forms the north side of the entrance to Smith Inlet. Discovered by Captain James Clark Ross, 1841, who named it for Thomas E.L. Moore, mate on the Terror.

=== Scharon Bluff ===
70°58′S 167°24′E. A steep rock bluff 1,000 metres (3,300 ft) high on the south side of Tapsell Foreland. The bluff surmounts the north side of Barnett Glacier, 9 nautical miles (17 km; 10 mi) west of Cape Moore. Mapped by USGS from surveys and United States Navy air photos, 1960-63. Named by US-ACAN for LeRoy H. Scharon, United States Exchange Scientist (geophysics) at Molodezhnaya Station, winter 1968.

=== Matthews Ridge ===
70°57′S 167°03′E. A high, mostly snow-covered ridge, 6 nautical miles (11 km; 6.9 mi) long, on the south side of Tapsell Foreland. The ridge forms the east wall of McElroy Glacier and terminates to the south at Barnett Glacier. Mapped by USGS from surveys and United States Navy air photos, 1960-63. Named by US-ACAN for Jerry L. Matthews, geologist who worked in the Horlick Mountains, 1965-66, and the McMurdo Station area, 1966-67.

== Sources ==
- Alberts, Fred G., ed. (1995), Geographic Names of the Antarctic (PDF) (2 ed.), United States Board on Geographic Names This article incorporates public domain material from websites or documents of the United States Board on Geographic Names.
- Yule Bay, USGS: United States Geographic Board

This article incorporates public domain material from websites or documents of the United States Geological Survey.
