= Hooker, Ohio =

Unincorporated community in Ohio, U.S.

Coordinates: 39°44′51″N 82°39′36″W

Hooker is an unincorporated community in Fairfield County, in the U.S. state of Ohio.

== History ==
A post office called Hookers Station was established in 1869, the name was changed to Hooker in 1882, and the post office closed in 1932. In 1912, Hooker had 300 inhabitants.
