= Hooker, California =

Unincorporated community in California, United States

Coordinates: 40°18′03″N 122°19′37″W

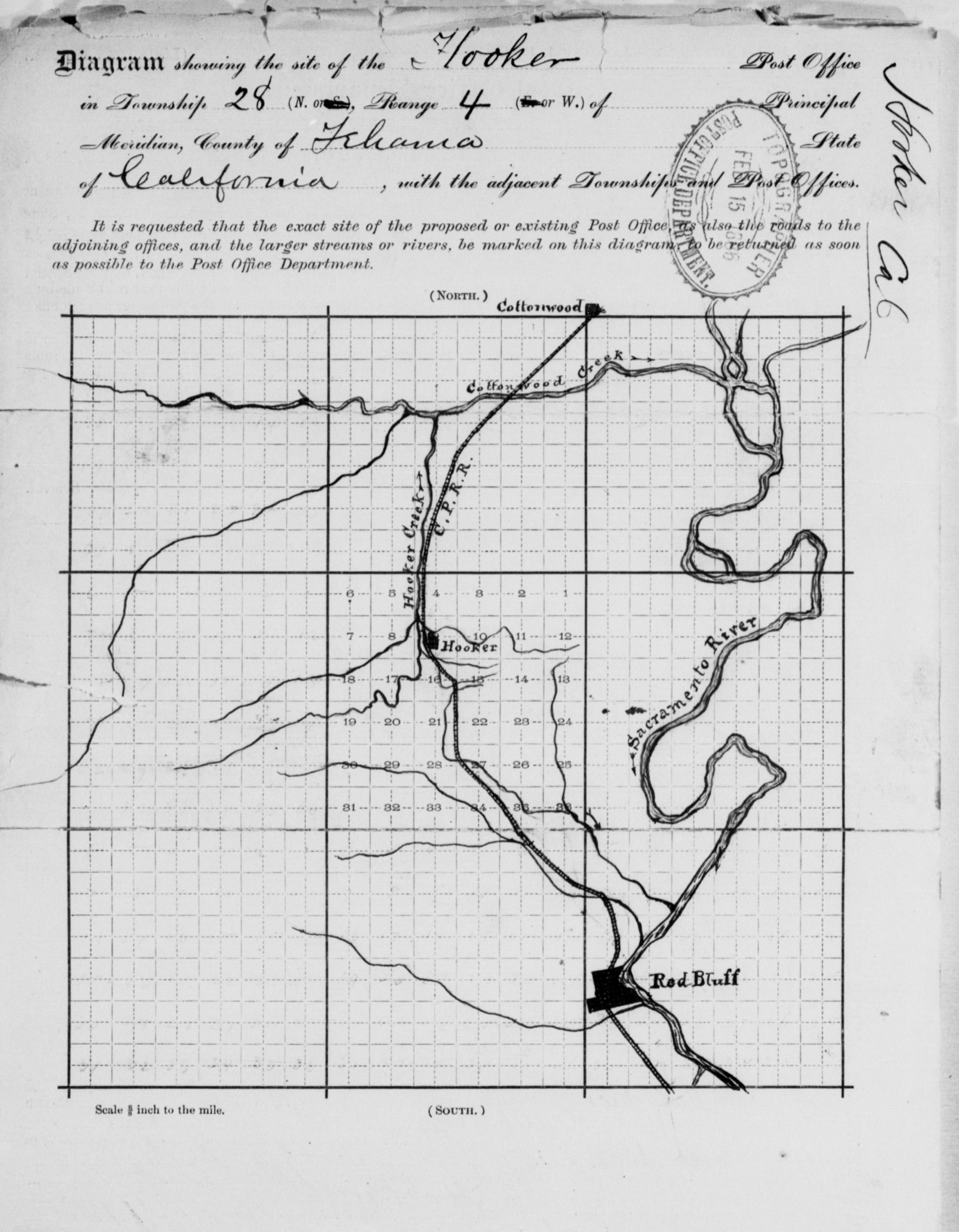
Location map of Hooker, 1886

Hooker is an unincorporated area in northwestern Tehama County, California, United States, near Hooker Creek. It is an agricultural community.

== History ==
The community takes its name from J. M. Hooker, who settled near the mouth of Hooker Creek in 1852. Hooker railroad station took its name from the creek.

A post office was in operation at Hooker from November 20, 1885. It was reestablished on May 31, 1889, and was closed on October 31, 1928. The community once had a schoolhouse, Hooker School, now defunct.

== Population ==
Based on 1990 census data, a United States Department of Agriculture report found that the population of the Hooker block group aggregation was 3,011.
