= Yule Bay =

Bay in Antarctica

- Location within Antarctica
- Coordinates: 70°44′S 166°40′E
- Ocean/sea sources: Southern Ocean
- Basin countries: Antarctica

Yule Bay (70°44′S 166°40′E) is a bay indenting the coast of northern Victoria Land between Cape Hooker and Cape Dayman. An inner (western) portion of the bay is circumscribed by Bates Point and Ackroyd Point.

== Exploration and name ==
Discovered by Captain James Clark Ross, 1841, who named it for Henry B. Yule, Second Master on HMS Erebus.

In 2020, a penguin colony was seen at the bay.

== Location ==
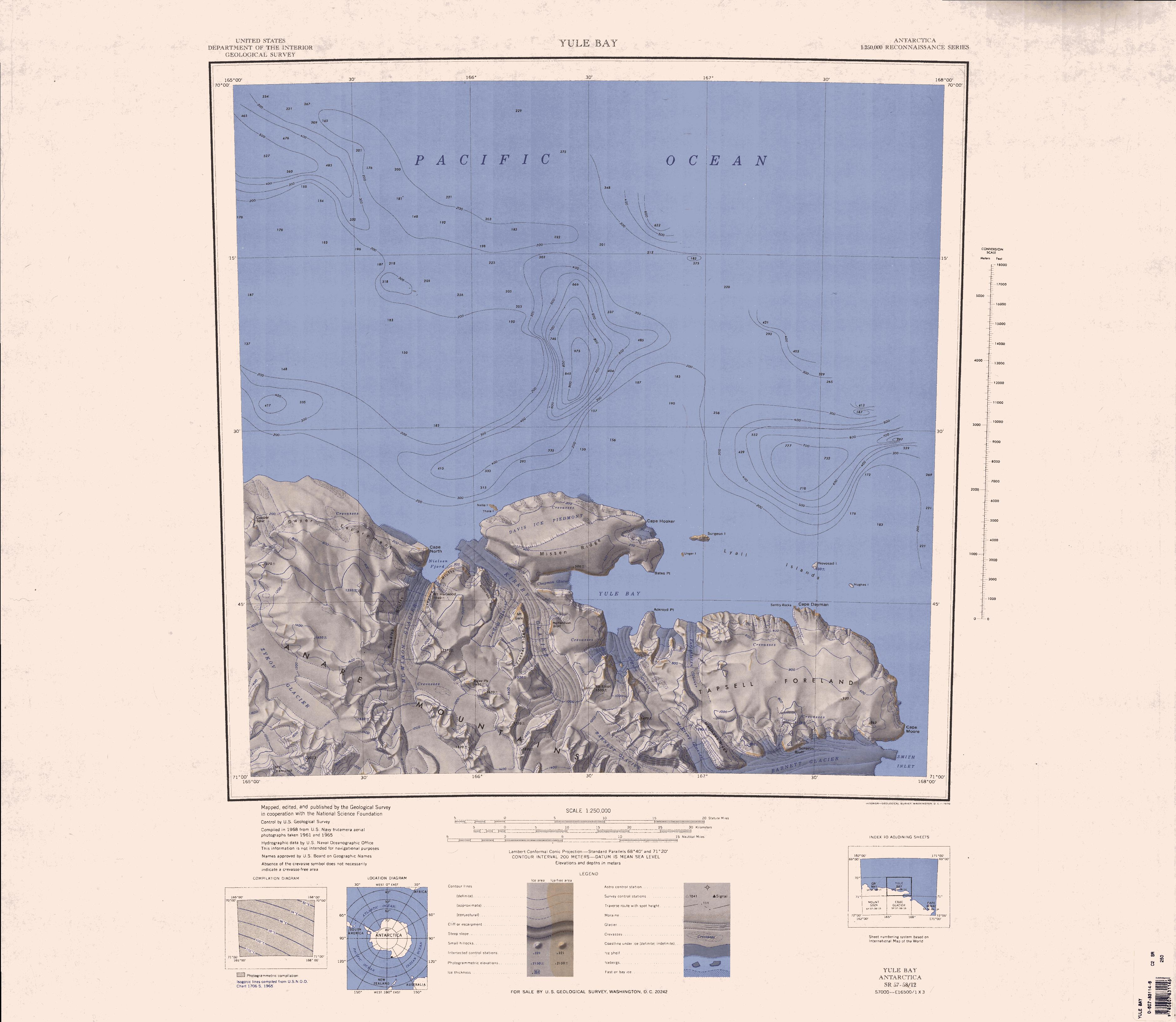
Yule Bay near the center

Yule Bay opens into the Pacific Ocean to the south of Davis Ice Piedmont and Missen Ridge. Chapman Glacier flows into the bay from the west. O'Hara Glacier enters from the south. Ackroyd Point to the south and Bates Point at the end of Missen Ridge define the inner entrance of the bay. Cape Hooker and Cape Dayman define the outer entrance. The Lyall Islands are to the east, across the outer entrance.

== Features ==
=== Bates Point ===
70°43′S 166°47′E. Ice-covered point forming the north side of the entrance to Yule Bay. Mapped by the United States Geological Survey (USGS) from surveys and United States Navy air photos, 1960-63. Named by the United States Advisory Committee on Antarctic Names (US-ACAN) for Lieutenant Thomas R. Bates, United States Navy, Flight Surgeon and Medical Officer at McMurdo Station, 1964.

=== Chapman Glacier ===
70°43′S 166°24′E. Glacier at the head of Yule Bay. Named by the Australian National Antarctic Research Expedition (ANARE) for A. Chapman, a member of the helicopter team in this vicinity during the AN ARE (Thala Dan), 1962, led by Phillip Law.

=== O'Hara Glacier ===
70°49′S 166°40′E. A glacier just west of Ackroyd Point, flowing northwest into the south side of Yule Bay. Mapped by USGS from surveys and United States Navy air photos, 1960-63. Named by US-ACAN for Norbert W. O'Hara, a member of the United States ArmyRP party which conducted studies of the Ross Ice Shelf, 1965-66.

=== Ackroyd Point ===
70°46′S 166°47′E. A point situated just east of O'Hara Glacier along the south side of the inner portion of Yule Bay. Mapped by USGS from surveys and United States Navy air photos, 1960-62. Named by US-ACAN for Lieutenant Frederick W. Ackroyd, MC, United States Navy, Medical Officer with the winter party at the Naval Air Facility at McMurdo Sound, 1958.

== Sources ==
- Alberts, Fred G., ed. (1995), Geographic Names of the Antarctic (PDF) (2 ed.), United States Board on Geographic Names This article incorporates public domain material from websites or documents of the United States Board on Geographic Names.
- Yule Bay, USGS: United States Geographic Board

This article incorporates public domain material from websites or documents of the United States Geological Survey.
