= Huka Prawn Park =

Tourist attraction in New Zealand

Coordinates: 38.62981°S 176.10068°E

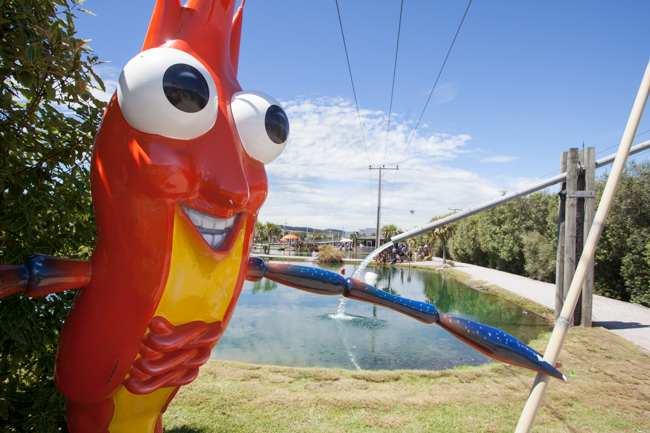
Huka Prawn Park's mascot Shawn the Prawn

The Huka Prawn Park is an aquaculture venture and tourist attraction located 10 minutes north of Taupō. It was started in 1987, and is currently New Zealand's only prawn farm. It can produce over 30 tonnes of prawns a year.

The Huka Prawn Park grows giant Malaysian river prawns (Macrobrachium rosenbergii), by using geothermal waste water from the Contact Energy Wairakei geothermal powerstation. It uses 250 tonnes per hour in summer and 400 tonnes in winter of over 90 °C geothermal waste waster in a system of heat exchangers to heat water from the Waikato River to rear the prawns.

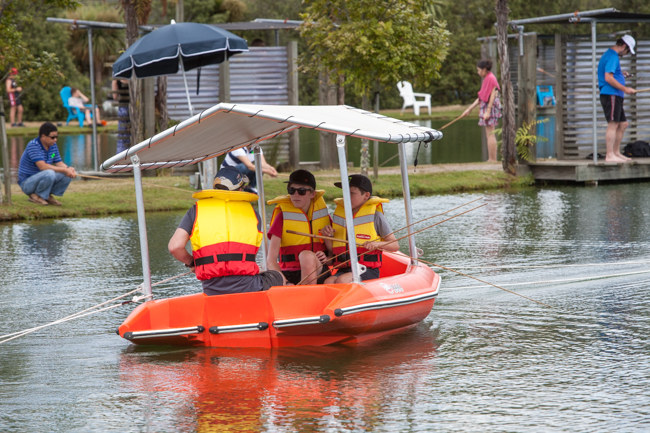
People fish for prawns from a row boat at Huka Prawn Park

The park offers activities such as prawn fishing, guided tours of the park, and an activity loop with a number of interactive water features. Visitors can make use of stand up paddle boards, pedal boats and an aqua trike to pedal over a pond full of prawns. Huka Prawn Park has become one of the major draw-cards for tourists to the Taupō region. It now has more than 75,000 visitors a year, with a large number of Chinese among the international visitors. It uses a mascot, Shawn the Prawn, for marketing purposes. Shawn the Prawn often visits his guest on school and public holidays.

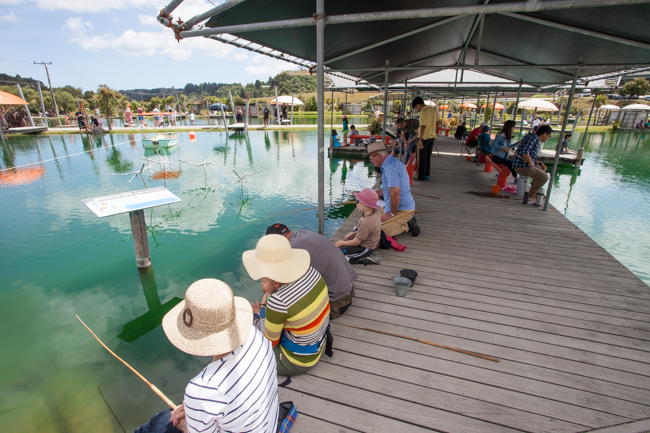
People fish for prawns on a bridge at Huka Prawn Park
