= Hooker Creek =

Stream in California, U.S.

Coordinates: 40.3716°N 122.3054°W

Hooker Creek is a stream in the U.S. state of California. The stream flows for 16 miles (26 km) before it empties into Cottonwood Creek.

Hooker Creek has the name of J. M. Hooker, a pioneer settler, after whom the nearby community of Hooker in Tehama County is also named.
