= Davis Ice Piedmont =

Ice piedmont on the north coast of Victoria Land, Antarctica

- Location within Antarctica
- Location: East Antarctica
- Coordinates: 70°38′S 166°16′E
- Terminus: Southern Ocean

Davis Ice Piedmont (70°38′S 166°16′E) is an ice piedmont about 10 nautical miles (19 km; 12 mi) long and 4 nautical miles (7.4 km; 4.6 mi) wide, located along the north side of Missen Ridge on the north coast of Victoria Land, Antarctica.

== Exploration and naming ==
The name Cape Davis, after John E. Davis, Second Master of HMS Terror, was given to a cape in the immediate area by Captain James Clark Ross in 1841. Since no significant cape exists here, the United States Advisory Committee on Antarctic Names (US-ACAN) and the New Zealand Antarctic Place-Names Committee (NZ-APC) have reapplied the name "Davis" to this ice piedmont.

== Location ==
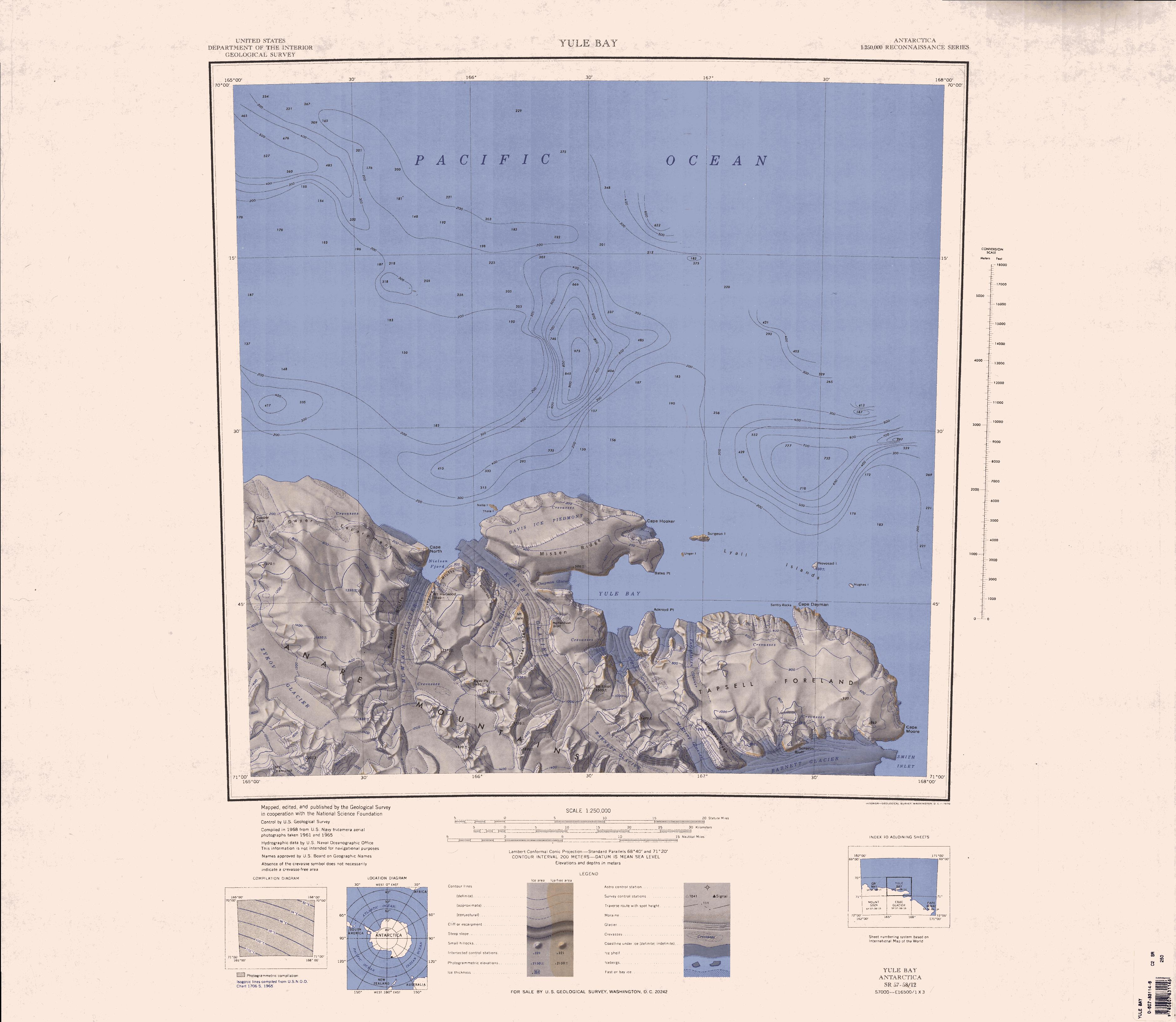
Davis Ice Piedmont near the center on the coast

The Davis Ice Piedmont extends into the Pacific Ocean to the north of Kirkby Glacier and Missen Ridge, which forms the north side of Yule Bay. Cape Hooker lies to the east of the piedmont. Nella Island, Thala Island and the Lyall Islands lie in the sea near the piedmont.

== Nearby features ==
=== Missen Ridge ===
70°41′S 166°24′E. A long, ice-covered ridge situated south of the Davis Ice Piedmont and extending along the peninsula of which Cape Hooker is the northeast point. Named by ANARE for R. Missen, weather technician on the ANARE (Thala Dan) cruise along this coast, 1962.

=== Cape Hooker ===
70°38′S 166°45′E. Cape on the northeast portion of the peninsula which includes Davis Ice Piedmont. With Cape Dayman to the ESE, it forms an outer entrance point to Yule Bay. Discovered by Captain James Clark Ross, 1841, who named it for Joseph Dalton Hooker (later Sir Joseph), naturalist and assistant surgeon on the Erebus who became internationally famous as a botanist.

=== Nella Island ===
70°37′S 166°04′E. The northern of two small, rocky islands lying just off the northwest edge of Davis Ice Piedmont. Named by ANARE after M.V. Nella Dan, one of two expedition ships used by ANARE in 1962 to explore this area.

=== Thala Island ===
70°37′S 166°05′E. The southern of two small, rocky islands lying just off the northwest edge of Davis Ice Piedmont. Named by ANARE after M.V. Thala Dan, one of two expedition ships used by ANARE in 1962 to explore this area.

== Sources ==
- Alberts, Fred G., ed. (1995), Geographic Names of the Antarctic (PDF) (2 ed.), United States Board on Geographic Names This article incorporates public domain material from websites or documents of the United States Board on Geographic Names.
- Yule Bay, USGS: United States Geographic Board

This article incorporates public domain material from websites or documents of the United States Geological Survey.
