= Mount Hooker (Canada) =

Mountain in Alberta and British Columbia, Canada

- Location within Alberta Location within British Columbia Location within Canada

Highest point
- Elevation: 3,287 m (10,784 ft)
- Prominence: 540 m (1,770 ft)
- Listing: Mountains of Alberta; Mountains of British Columbia
- Coordinates: 52°24′20″N 118°05′41″W

Geography
- Country: Canada
- Provinces: Alberta and British Columbia
- Parent range: Park Ranges
- Topo map: NTS 83D8 Athabasca Pass

Climbing
- First ascent: 1924 by Alfred J. Ostheimer, M.M. Strumia, J. Monroe Thorington, guided by Conrad Kain

Mount Hooker is located on the border of Alberta and British Columbia, Canada. It was named in 1827 by David Douglas after William Jackson Hooker. Until the turn of the century, Mount Hooker and the nearby Mount Brown were thought to be the highest mountains in the Canadian Rockies (see Hooker and Brown).

== See also ==
- List of peaks on the British Columbia–Alberta border
