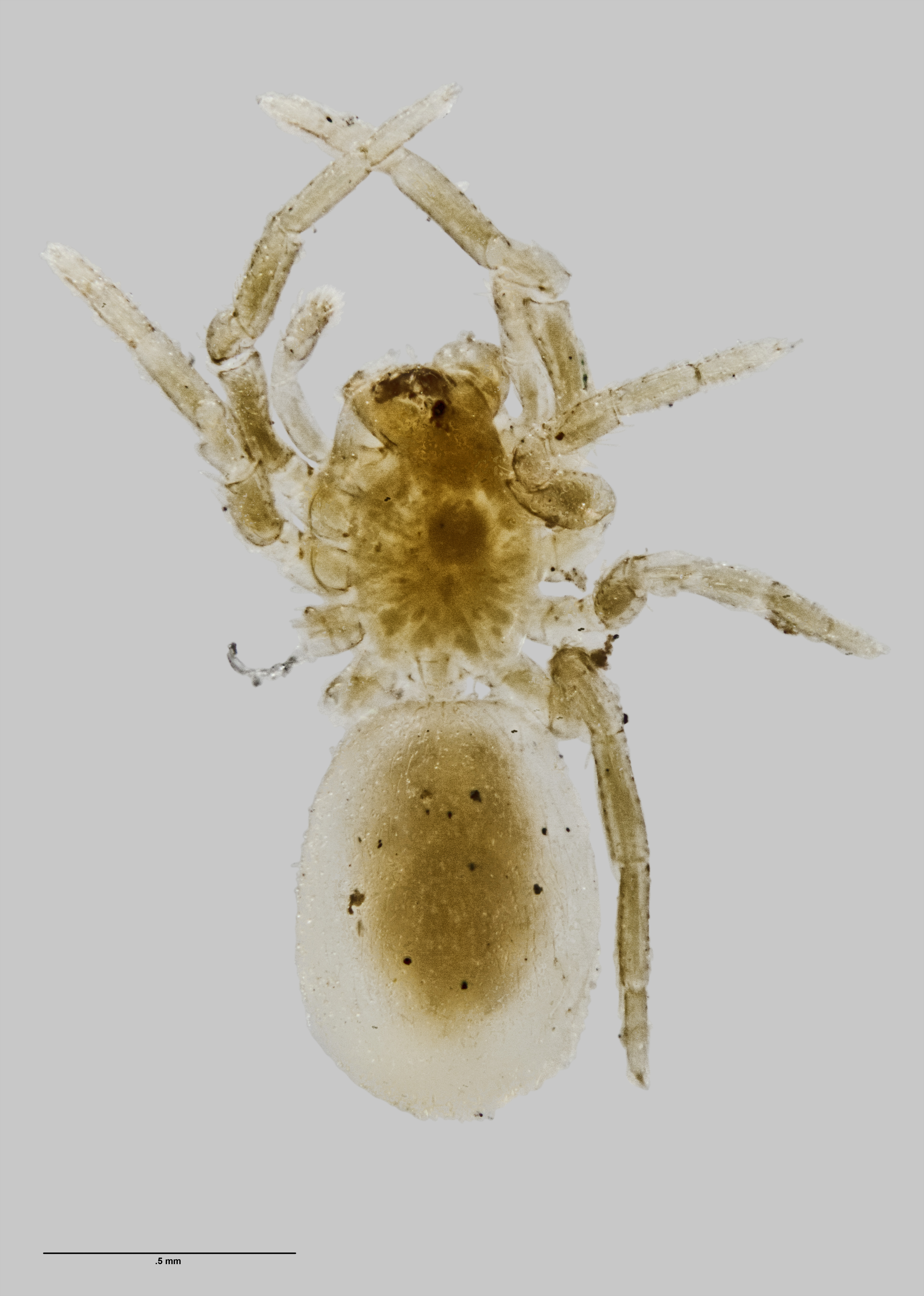
- Huka alba

Scientific classification
- Kingdom: Animalia
- Phylum: Arthropoda
- Subphylum: Chelicerata
- Class: Arachnida
- Order: Araneae
- Infraorder: Araneomorphae
- Family: Agelenidae
- Genus: Huka; Forster & Wilton, 1973

Type species
- H. pallida Forster & Wilton, 1973

Species
- 5, see text

= Huka =

Genus of spiders

Huka is a genus of South Pacific funnel weavers first described by Raymond Robert Forster & C. L. Wilton in 1973.

== Species ==
As of October 2026 it contains five species, all found in New Zealand:

- Huka alba Forster & Wilton, 1973 — New Zealand
- Huka lobata Forster & Wilton, 1973 — New Zealand
- Huka minima Forster & Wilton, 1973 — New Zealand
- Huka minuta Forster & Wilton, 1973 — New Zealand
- Huka pallida Forster & Wilton, 1973 — New Zealand
