= Cape Hooker (South Shetland Islands) =

Headland of Antarctica

Coordinates: 63°18′S 61°56′W

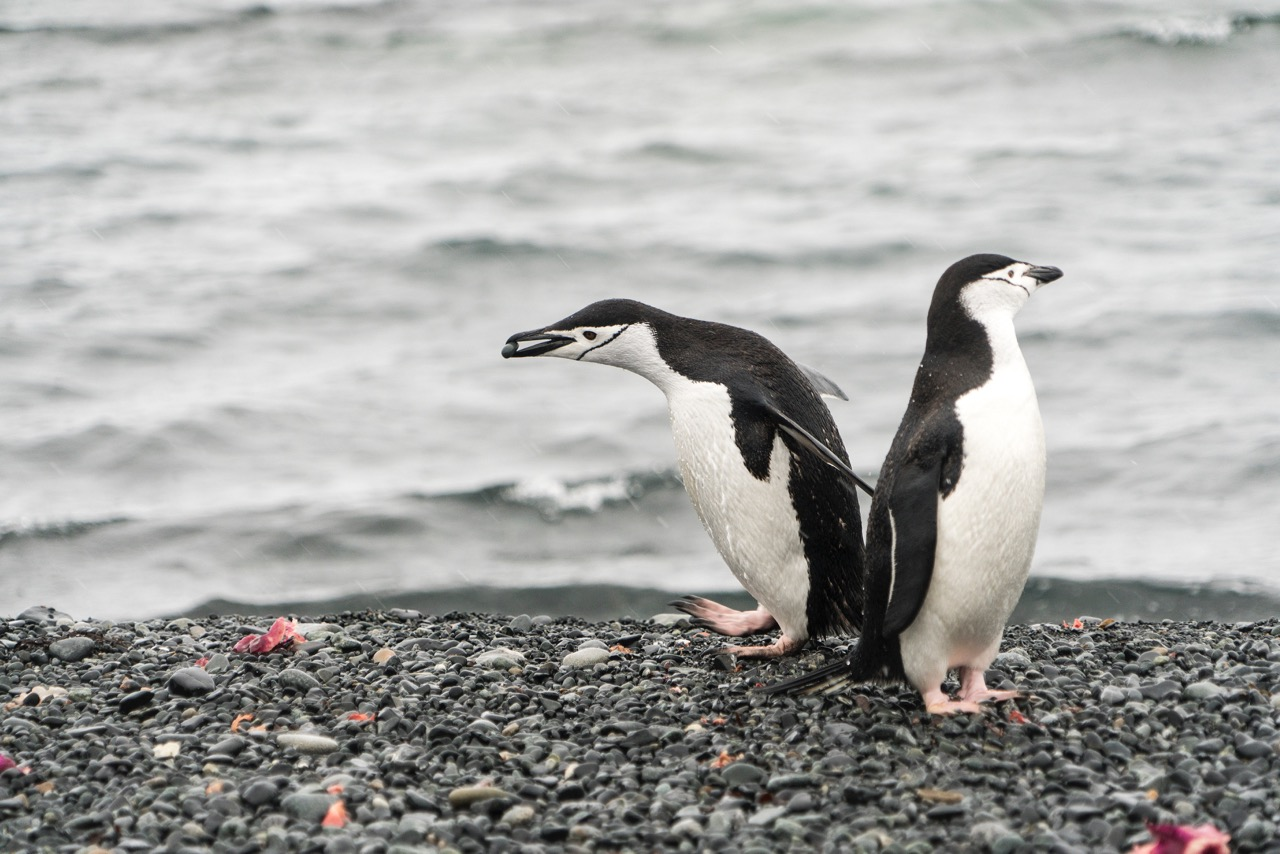
Chinstrap penguins breed in the IBA

Cape Hooker is the south-eastern point of Low Island, in the South Shetland Islands of Antarctica. The feature was roughly charted by nineteenth century sealers; it was further charted by Commander Henry Foster in 1829 but shown as the north-eastern point of the island. Following air photography by the Falkland Islands and Dependencies Aerial Survey Expedition in 1956, the charted shape of the island was drastically altered and the name Cape Hooker was applied to its south-eastern point as originally described.

== Important Bird Area ==
The site has been identified as an Important Bird Area (IBA) by BirdLife International because it supports a large breeding colony of about 10,000 pairs of chinstrap penguins.
