= Mount Hooker (Wyoming) =

Mountain in Wyoming, United States

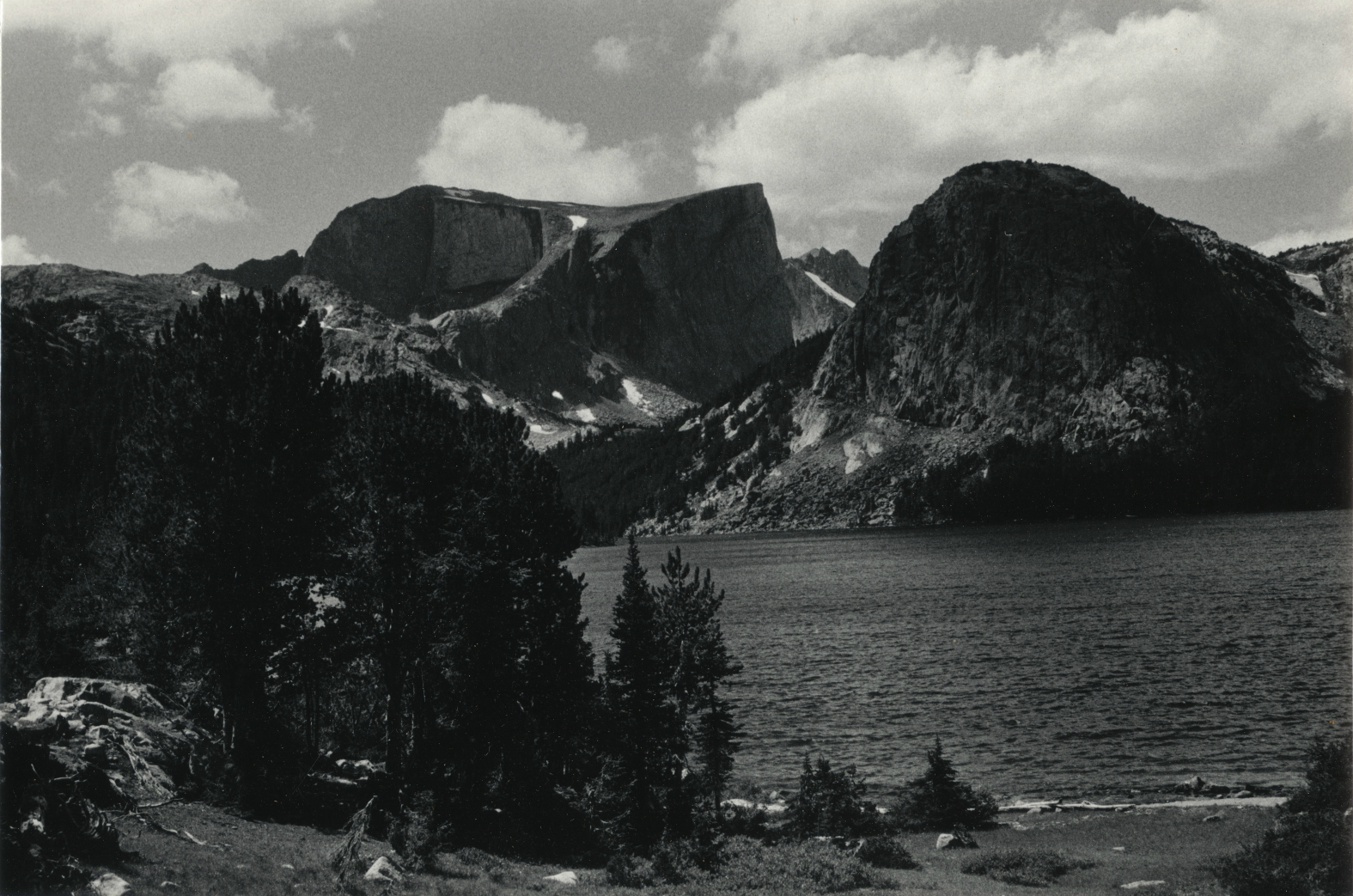
- The steep north face of Mount Hooker rises beyond Grave Lake

Highest point
- Elevation: 12,509 ft (3,813 m)
- Prominence: 704 ft (215 m)
- Coordinates: 42°51′09″N 109°18′15″W

Geography
- Location within Wyoming Location within the United States
- Location: Sublette and Fremont County, Wyoming, U.S.
- Parent range: Wind River Range
- Topo map: USGS Mount Bonneville

Climbing
- Easiest route: class 5.0 to class 5.14a

Mount Hooker (12,509 feet (3,813 m)) is located in the Wind River Range in the U.S. state of Wyoming. Mount Hooker was named for Joseph Dalton Hooker, the prominent 19th-century British botanist and explorer. The north and east slopes of Mount Hooker present some of the tallest and steepest vertical cliffs in Wyoming, and the peak is also remote, being more than 20 mi (32 km) from a road. The formidable 1,800-foot (550 m) north face of Mount Hooker was first climbed in 1964 by Yosemite Valley climber Royal Robbins, along with Dick McCracken and Charlie Raymond, who took over three days to scale the cliff face. In 2013, a team free climbed one pitch rated at class 5.14a, grade VI during a multiple-day ascent requiring five other pitches rated above 5.12.

== Hazards ==
Encountering bears is a concern in the Wind River Range. There are other concerns as well, including bugs, wildfires, adverse snow conditions and nighttime cold temperatures.

Importantly, there have been notable incidents, including accidental deaths, due to falls from steep cliffs (a misstep could be fatal in this class 4/5 terrain) and due to falling rocks, over the years, including 1993, 2007 (involving an experienced NOLS leader), 2015 and 2018. Other incidents include a seriously injured backpacker being airlifted near SquareTop Mountain in 2005, and a fatal hiker incident (from an apparent accidental fall) in 2006 that involved state search and rescue. The U.S. Forest Service does not offer updated aggregated records on the official number of fatalities in the Wind River Range.
