= Athabasca Pass =

Mountain pass in Jasper National Park

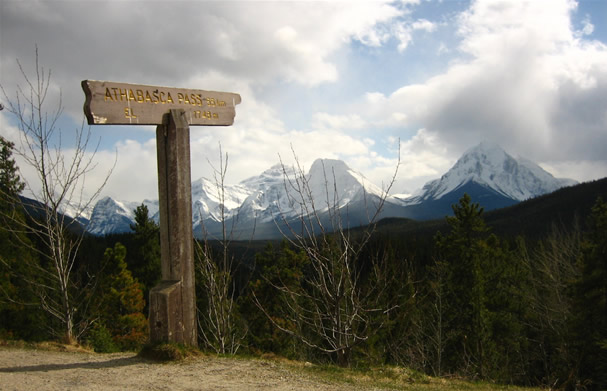

- Location within Alberta Location within British Columbia
- Elevation: 1,753 metres (5,751 ft)

Third Approach
- Location: Alberta–British Columbia border, Canada
- Range: Rocky Mountains
- Coordinates: 52°22′35″N 118°11′00″W
- Topo map: NTS 83D8 Athabasca Pass

National Historic Site of Canada
- Official name: Athabasca Pass National Historic Site of Canada
- Designated: 1971

Athabasca Pass (el. 1,753 m or 5,751 ft) is a high mountain pass in the Canadian Rockies on the border between Alberta and British Columbia. In fur trade days it connected Jasper House on the Athabasca River with Boat Encampment on the Columbia River.

The pass lies between Mount Brown and McGillivray Ridge. It is south of Yellowhead Pass and north of Howse Pass. The Committee's Punch Bowl, a glacial lake on the continental divide at the summit of the pass, is the headwaters of the Whirlpool River, a tributary of the Athabasca River. It also has an outlet to Pacific Creek, a tributary of the Columbia River to the south.

Athabasca Pass is first mentioned in the historical record in the papers of British explorer David Thompson, who was shown the route in 1811 by his Iroquois guide named Thomas. It became a major point on the fur trade route between Rupert's Land and the Columbia District, used by the York Factory Express. In recognition of that usage, it was designated a National Historic Site of Canada in 1971.

== See also ==
- List of Rocky Mountain passes on the continental divide
