= Washakie (disambiguation) =

Washakie may refer to:

People

- Washakie, (ca. 1804–1900), a Shoshone chief
  - Washakie (McGary), sculpture depicting the chief

Places

- Washakie, Utah, a ghost town
- Washakie basin, a United States endorheic basin within the Wyoming Basin physiographic province
- Washakie County, Wyoming
- Washakie Glacier in Wyoming
- Washakie National Forest in Wyoming
- Washakie Reservation, the reservation of the Northwestern Band of the Shoshone Nation, in Utah
- Washakie Ten, Wyoming, a census-designated place in Wyoming
- Washakie Wilderness, a Wyoming protected area within the Shoshone National Forest

Ships

- SS Chief Washakie, an American Liberty ship built in Portland, Oregon, in 1942
- USS Washakie (YTB-386), later YTM-386, a United States Navy harbor tug in service from 1944 to 1946 and from 1953 to probably 1975
