= Washakie =

Eastern Shoshone chief

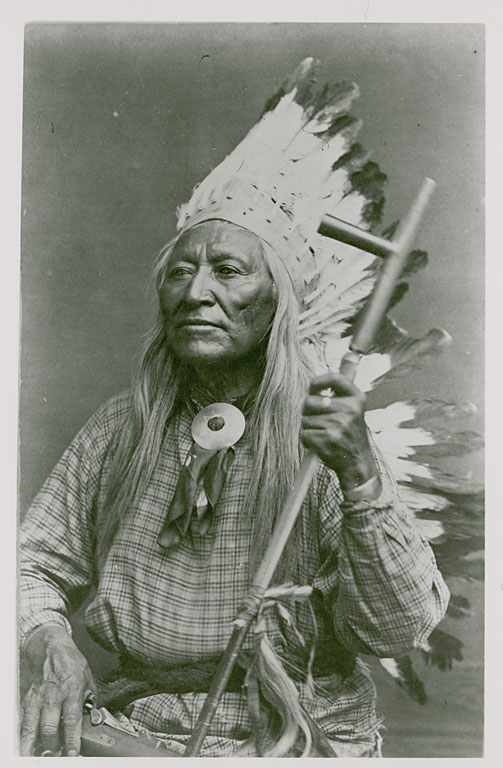
Washakie holding a pipe

Washakie (c.1804/1810 – February 20, 1900) was a prominent leader of the Shoshone people during the mid-19th century. He was first mentioned in 1840 in the written record of the American fur trapper, Osborne Russell. In 1851, at the urging of trapper Jim Bridger, Washakie led a band of Shoshones to the council meetings of the Treaty of Fort Laramie. Essentially from that time until his death, he was considered the head of the Eastern Shoshones by the representatives of the United States government. In 1979, he was inducted into the Hall of Great Westerners of the National Cowboy & Western Heritage Museum.

== Early life ==
Much about Washakie's early life remains unknown, but some information is revealed. Washakie was born between 1798 and 1810. The information below is mostly cited to Oregon historian Gale Ontko — who did extensive research and wrote a five volume popular history on the Western Shoshones, but whose interpretations and details vary from many other Shoshone historians that make no mention of Washakie having a connection to the Oregon Country.

According to Ontko, Washakie's mother Lost Woman was a Tussawehee (White Knife) Shoshone by birth. While most sources say his father was a Flathead, Ontko writes his father, Crooked Leg (Paseego), was an Umatilla rescued as a boy from slave traders at Wakemap and Celilo on the Columbia River in 1786 by Weasel Lungs, a Tussawehee dog soldier (White Knife) Shoshone medicine man.

Crooked Leg was adopted into Weasel Lungs' clan. He became a Tussawehee dog soldier (White Knife) and married Weasel Lungs' eldest daughter Lost Girl, later Lost Woman. His maternal grandmother, Chosro (Bluebird), was also Tussawehee by birth. Lost Woman's younger sister, Washakie's aunt, was Nanawu (Little Striped Squirrel). She was the mother of Chochoco (Has No Horse), a first cousin to Washakie.

On September 9, 1860, settlers under Elijah Utter were killed on the Oregon Trail by Shoshone and Bannack. Zachias Van Ornum, a relative of those killed, believed a white boy among the Shoshone was his nephew Reuben Van Ornum and took him away; the Shoshone protested that the boy was the son of a sister of Washakie and a French trapper.

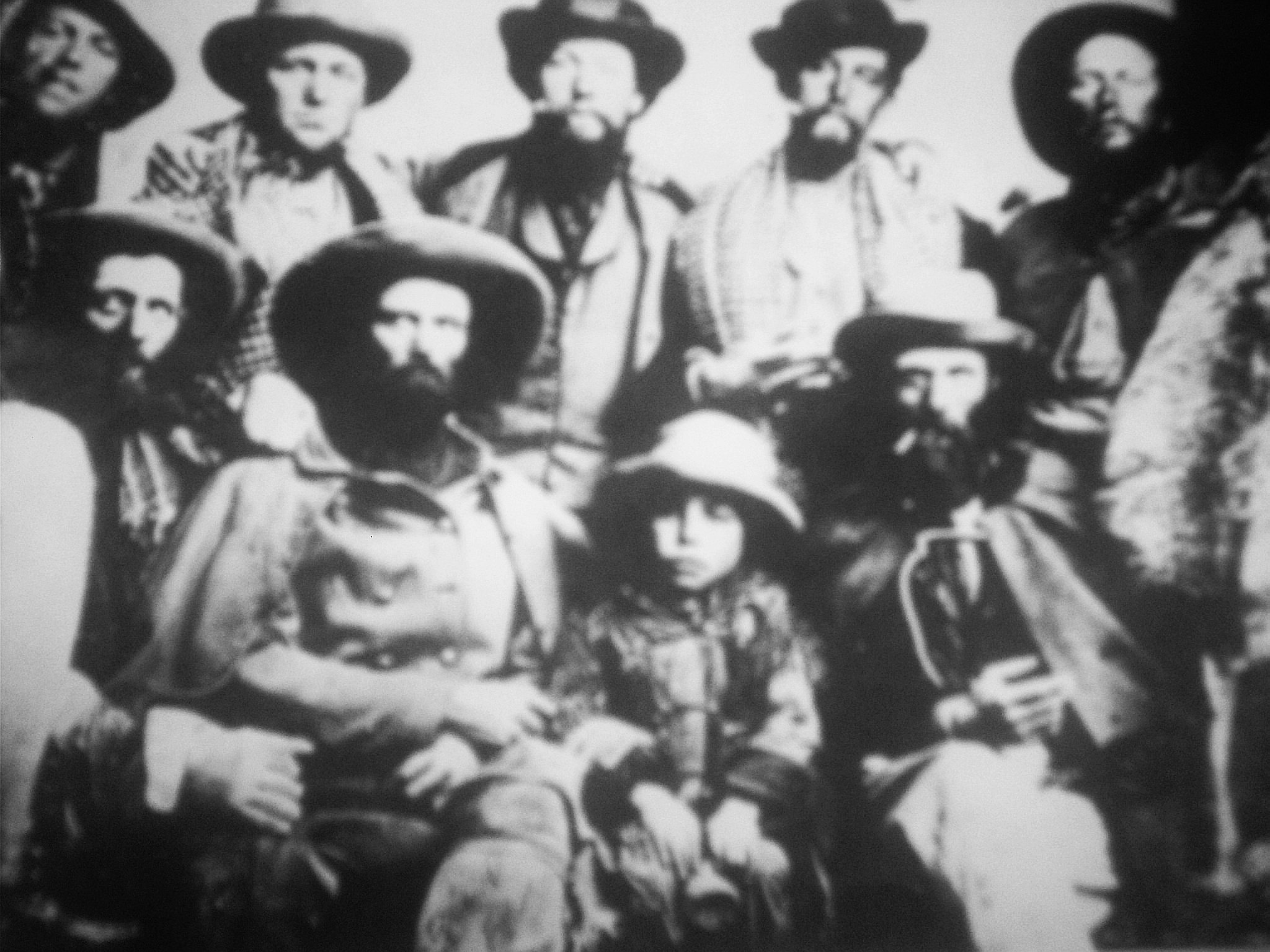
A picture of young "Reuben Van Ornum" seated in the middle: his uncle Zachias is to his left

Washakie's birth name was Pinaquanah ("Smells of Sugar"). He had other names before being called Washakie. When he was a teenager, he changed his name to Shoots the Buffalo Running. He was a high-stakes gambler, playing a game involving shaking small stones inside of a gourd rattle, rather like dice, so his friends renamed him Gourd Rattler.

According to Ontko, Pinaquanah met his first white men in 1811. Wilson Hunt's main party of Astorians, with the Pacific Fur brigade, were traveling down the Boise River from the mouth of the Bruneau River. Seven months late for their scheduled arrival at Fort Astoria, they happened into Crooked Leg's camp on the Boise. They needed horses, which Crooked Leg refused to sell to them; instead reluctantly selling them a few camas roots, dried fish, and four dogs. While Ontko details this incident, Hunt diaries from the date Ontko cites make no mention of Crooked Leg or Washakie.

According to Ontko, Crooked Leg was killed in 1824 by members of the Piegan Blackfeet when they raided a Shoshone hunting camp inside the Blackfoot hunting boundary. Every able-bodied Shoshone was following and hunting the migrating herds of game, as bison were now scarce in the Ochoco and the rest of the southern Blue Mountains, and food was in short supply. There had been a weak truce in the summer of 1820, between Fires Black Gun (Tooite Coon), (also known to white men as Cameahwait and Comeah Wait, brother to Sacajawea), and Piegan Blackfoot leader, Ugly Head. The Shoshone had been hunting high in the Montana Rockies, well north of the southern boundary of the Blackfoot hunting grounds, for any game they could find. A Piegan war party, led by Large Kidney and Four Horns, burst into one of their encampments on the Boulder River, to find Shoshone head chief Owitze (Twisted Hand), his war leader Red Wolf, and the popular young leader of the Tussawehee White Knife dog soldiers, Po'have (The Horse). Fighting ensued. Washakie, by now in his late teens and riding with the dog soldiers, led by Weahwewa (Wolf Dog), was moving north out of Wyoming country with a weapons shipment of Mexican guns from Comanche leader Shaved Head, and overheard the disturbance. Crooked Leg was camped a few miles away and Washakie immediately got word to him of the attack. When Crooked Leg arrived on the battle scene, he was killed. This version of events does not fit exactly with those recorded by other historians like Stamm, mentioned below.

The hunting ceased and the dog soldiers went on the war trail, backed by Comanche war chief Red Sleeves and his reinforcements. They combed the Boulder, the Yellowstone, and the Musselshell for Blackfoot and killed many. This victory by the Shoshone led to a council with the Blackfeet tribes, with the Shoshone once again a proud warrior society. At the council, it was agreed that the Blackfeet tribes would join forces with the Shoshone to restrict the expanding encroachment of trappers into each tribes' hunting grounds.

By the late 19th century, Washakie became head chief of the Eastern Shoshone. He was the only Shoshone warrior to be honored by the federal government of the United States, for leading General George Crook's army to defeat the Sioux, after Lieutenant Colonel George Armstrong Custer's defeat at the Little Big Horn. Again, this version by Ontko inflates Washakie's contributions to the Crook campaign. According to military records and the writings of John Broke, Washakie arrived in Crook's camp on Little Goose Creek, Wyoming, in July 1876 after the Little Bighorn battle. He demonstrated the horsemanship of Shoshone riders to Crook, and some of the riders took an active role in scouting with the Army, but Washakie himself was nearly 70 years old at this time and not as active as the younger scouts. However his support by providing scouts was helpful to the US Army.

The year of Washakie's birth date is debated. A missionary in 1883 recorded the year of his birth as 1798, but his tombstone was later inscribed with a birth date of 1804. Late in his life he told an agent at the Shoshone Agency that when he was 16, he had met Jim Bridger. Interpolating from the age of Bridger when he first went into the wilderness, researchers have determined that Washakie was likely born between 1808 and 1810. During his early childhood, the Blackfeet Indians attacked a combined camp of Flathead and Lemhi people while the latter were on a buffalo hunt near Three Forks, Gallatin County, Montana (where the Gallatin, Madison, and Jefferson Rivers form the headwaters of the Missouri River). After Crooked Leg was killed, his mother and at least one sister were able to make their way back to the Lemhis on the Salmon River in Idaho. During the attack, Washakie was lost and possibly wounded. According to some family traditions, he was found by either Bannock Indians who had also come to hunt in the region, or by a combined Shoshone and Bannock band. He may have become the adopted son of the band leader. For the next twenty five years (c. 1815–1840) he learned the traditions and ways of a warrior that were typical of any Shoshone youth of that period.

Although the name by which he would be widely known has been translated in various ways, it apparently dealt with his tactics in battle. One story describes how Washakie devised a large rattle by placing stones in an inflated and dried balloon of buffalo hide, which he tied on a stick. He carried the device into battle to frighten enemy horses, earning the name "The Rattle" or "Gourd Rattler". Another translation of "Washakie" is "Shoots-on-the-Run."

== Military career ==
24-foot statue of Washakie on the University of Wyoming campus in Laramie

Fur trapper records of the 1830s describe Washakie as being feared by the Blackfeet. He had a life-long scar on his cheek from an arrow that was inflicted by an enemy during a raid. When as an older man his authority was questioned by fellow Eastern Shoshone, Washakie sought to reconfirm his prowess as a warrior to maintain his status. He disappeared for many days, then returned having singlehandedly secured several scalps of his enemies, a daring feat for a man of any age.

In 1866, Washakie fought one-on-one with Crow Chief Big Robber to end a stalemate over rights to occupy the Wind River Basin, which the Crow claimed through the 1851 Horse Creek Treaty of Fort Laramie, though the area had long been used by the Shoshone. Washakie emerged victorious and displayed his enemy's heart on a lance. This event is memorialized in the place name of Crowheart Butte on the Wind River Indian Reservation, though the actual battle took place along a nearby draw. In 2005 a sculpture of the event was unveiled at the University of Wyoming's Washakie Dining Center in Laramie.

== Fur trade ==
Washakie's band evidently participated in the fur trade rendezvous (1825–1840), since those rendezvous took place within the Green River, Wind River, and Snake River regions claimed by the horse-owning and buffalo-hunting Shoshone and Bannock bands of eastern Idaho. Late in life, Washakie reported that he and Jim Bridger became fast friends, and indeed, Bridger became Washakie's son-in-law in 1850 when he took Washakie's daughter as his third wife. Bridger, born March 17, 1804, entered Shoshone country in 1824 (Washakie said Bridger was the older of the two). Washakie learned French and some English from trappers and traders. Washakie's close association with the trappers developed into a similar relationship with U.S. officials.

== Fort Bridger Treaties ==
In 1863, and again in 1868, he signed treaties with the U.S. at Fort Bridger, Wyoming. The Fort Bridger Treaty of 1863 established a generic Shoshone country, whose borders extended eastward to the crest of the Wind River Range, south of the Uintah Mountains of Utah, and on the northern side, to the crest of the Bitterroots. The western border was left undefined, but was understood to include most of the Snake River as far as the Oregon border. This treaty included a number of Shoshone and Bannock Indian bands besides that of Washakie. The Fort Bridger Treaty of 1868 was established at the Fort Bridger Treaty Council of 1868 and it proved more significant, for it established the Shoshone and Bannock Indian Agency located in west-central Wyoming. Moreover, this was land selected by Washakie and his headmen of the Eastern Shoshones. The initial reservation included about 3,000,000 acres (12,000 km^{2}) in Wyoming's Wind River country for his people. Although an 1872 land cession reduced the size by 800,000 acres (3,200 km^{2}), this valley remains the home of the Eastern Shoshones today. He was also determined that Native Americans should be educated, and he gave land to Welsh clergyman John Roberts to establish a boarding school where Shoshone girls learned traditional crafts and language.

== Artwork ==
Washakie was a hide painter. An 1880 painted elk hide at the Glenbow Museum is attributed to him. The hide painting portrays the Sun Dance. One of his sons, Cotsiogo (also known as Codsiogo and Katsikodi), was a prominent hide painter. His great-granddaughter, Eva McAdams became a prominent buckskin needlework artist and regalia maker.

== Washakie and The Church of Jesus Christ of Latter-day Saints ==
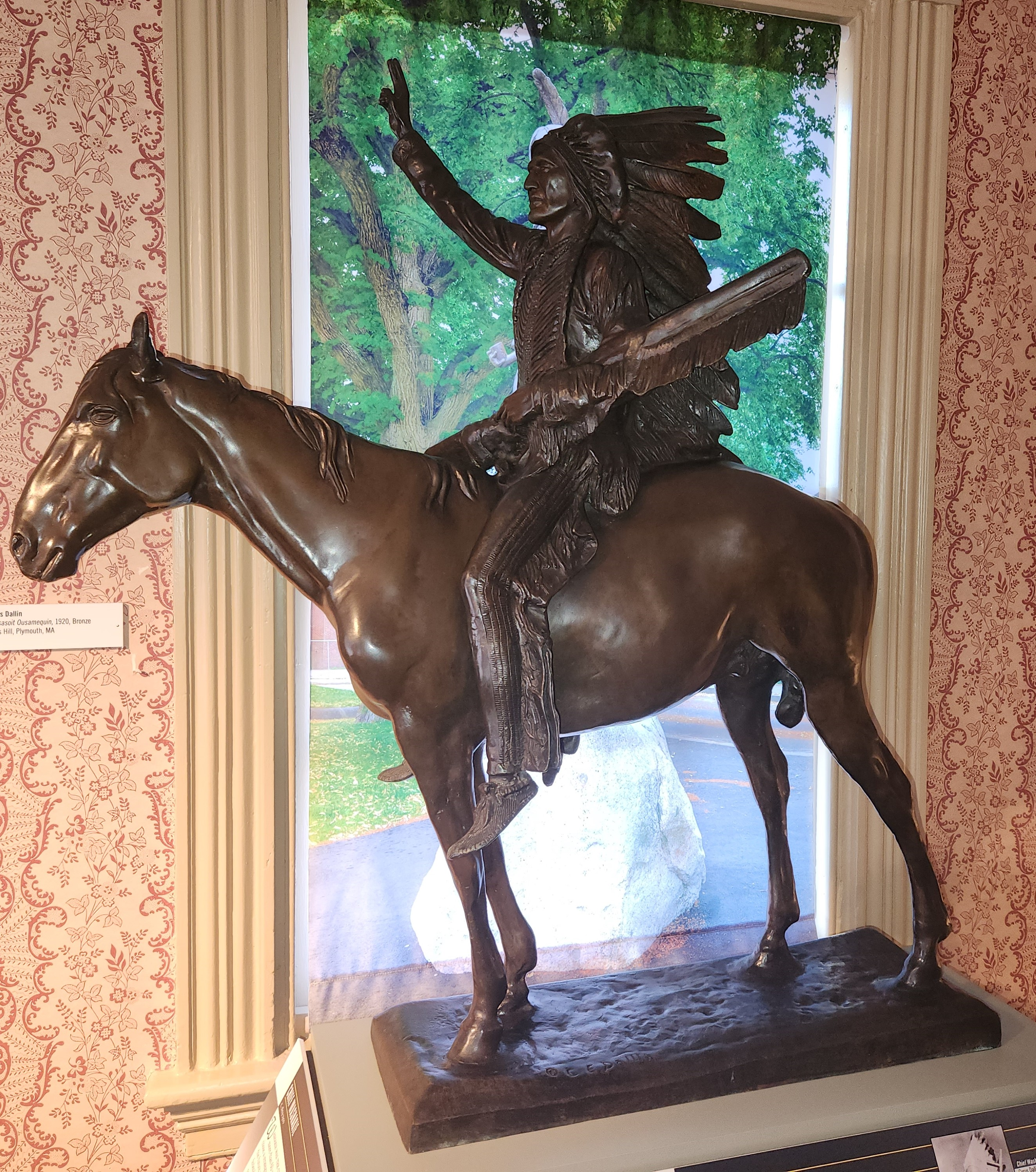
Chief Washakie 1914 bronze sculpture by Cyrus Dallin at the Cyrus Dallin Art Museum

Washakie was a friend of Brigham Young and expressed sadness at the fighting his people had often done with the Utahns. It was not until after 1880, after Young's death, that Washakie became a member of the Church of Jesus Christ of Latter-day Saints. He was baptized on September 25, 1880, by Amos R. Wright. About 300 other Shoshone joined the church at this point.

== Washakie and Episcopalianism ==
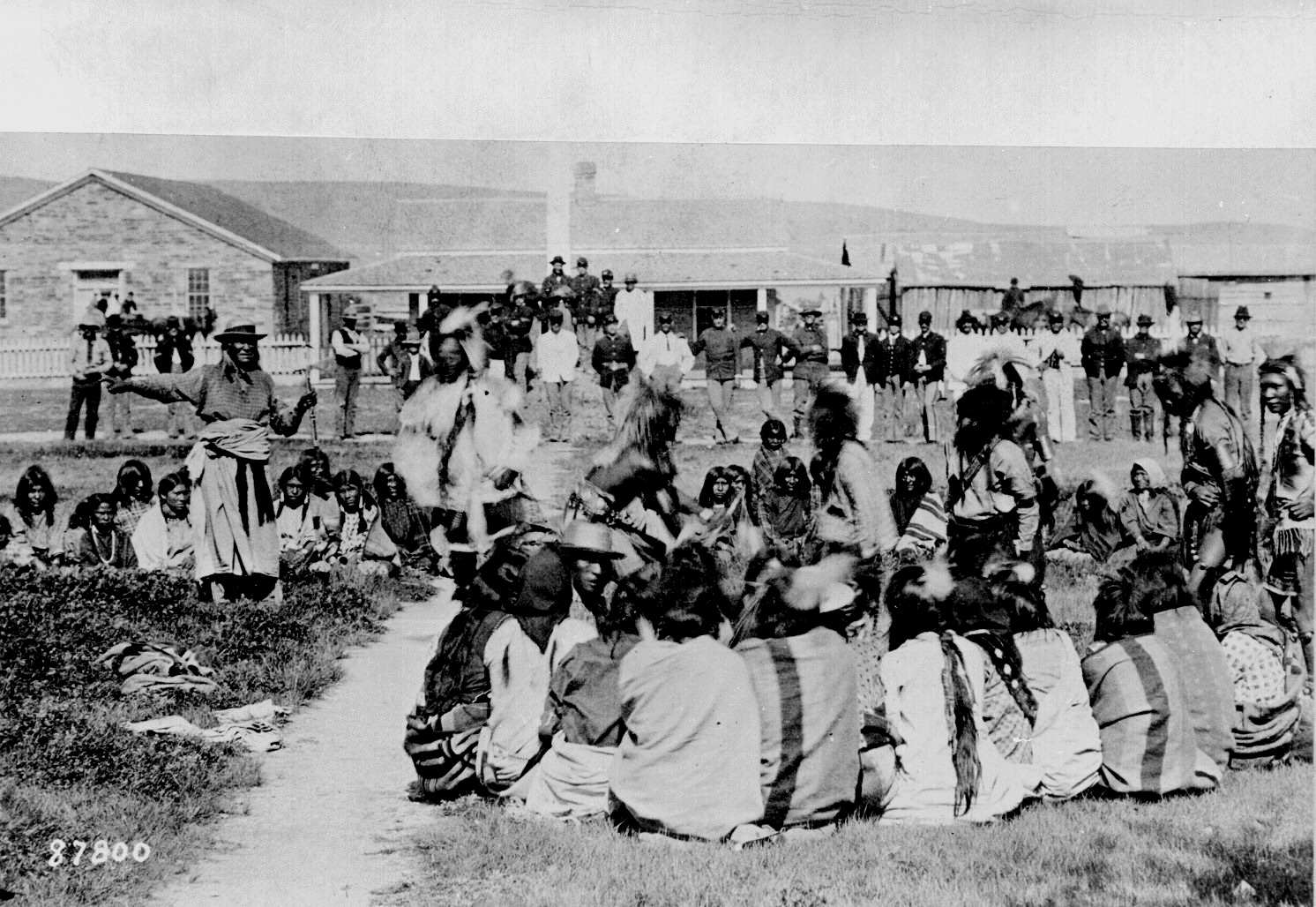
"Shoshone at Ft. Washakie, Wyoming Native American reservation. Chief Washakie (at left) extends his right arm." Some of the Shoshones are dancing as the soldiers look on, 1892

In 1883, the Episcopal Church assigned John Roberts to minister to the Shoshone and Arapahos on the Wind River Reservation. Roberts established several churches on the reservation, as well as within his designated 150 mile radius. Although Washakie's son was killed by a white man in 1885 during a dispute over alcohol, which purportedly led Washakie to vow revenge against whites, Roberts purportedly earned the Chief's respect by offering his own life in exchange. Furthermore, Roberts learned Shoshone customs, beliefs and language, and translated the Bible into Shoshone (and Arapahoe). c. 1888, Washakie helped Roberts establish a boarding school where Shoshone girls from distant villages could learn traditional crafts and language, by donating 160 acres near Trout Creek, which many considered sacred ground.

Some historical records claim that late in life, Washakie chose Episcopalianism as his faith, was baptized in 1897, and was buried in a service officiated by his friend Roberts, on February 22, 1900. Other historical records, however, indicate that Washakie chose to be baptized as a member of The Church of Jesus Christ of Latter-Day Saints and that Roberts, the Episcopalian, baptized Washakie without Washakie’s knowledge or consent, when Washakie was unconscious on his deathbed.

Congress recognized the Episcopalian church's ownership of the school in 1909, when it deactivated the fort named after Chief Washakie. Although the school closed c. 1945, many of the historic girls' school buildings survive today.

== Honors and legacy ==
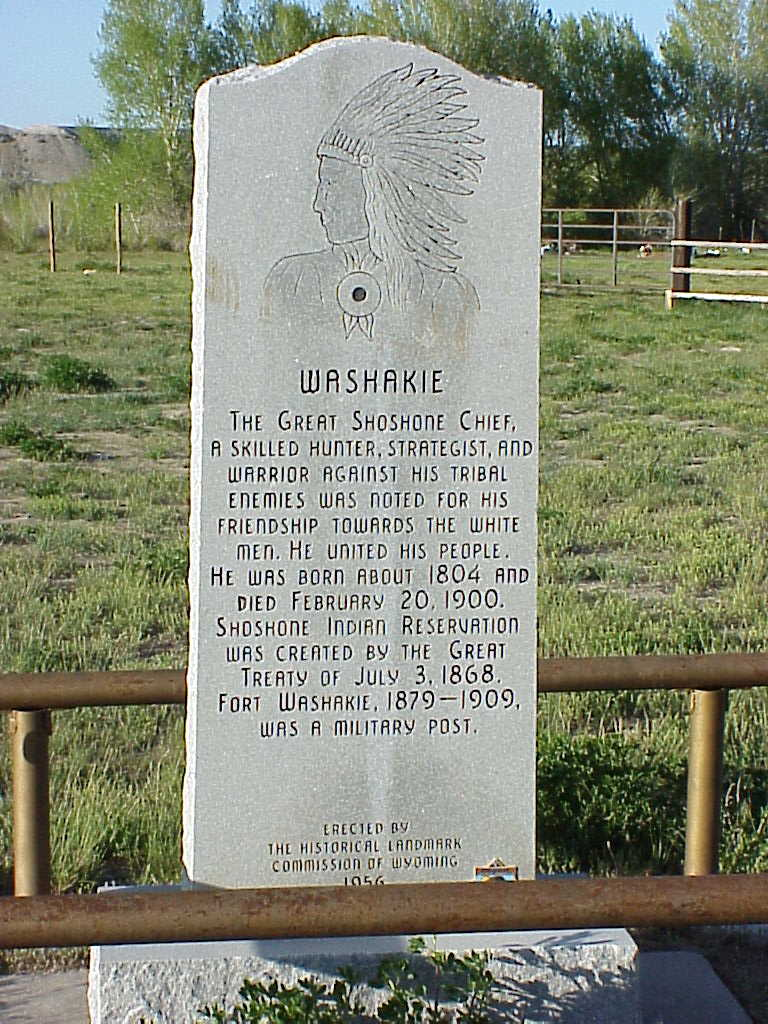
His memorial stone in Ft. Washakie

His prowess in battle, his efforts for peace, and his commitment to his people's welfare made him one of the most respected leaders in Native American history. In 1878, a U.S. Army outpost located on the reservation was renamed Fort Washakie, which was the only U.S. military outpost to be named after a Native American. Upon his death in 1900, he became the only known Native American to be given a full military funeral.

Washakie County, Wyoming was named for him and there is a statue of his head in front of the Washakie County Courthouse. In 2000, the state of Wyoming donated a bronze statue of Washakie to the National Statuary Hall Collection. There is also a statue of Washakie in downtown Casper, Wyoming. The dining hall at the University of Wyoming is also named after him. The current ghost town of Washakie, Utah was also named after him.

During World War II, a 422-foot (129 m) liberty ship built in Portland, Oregon, in 1942, SS Chief Washakie, was named in his honor. USS Washakie, a U.S. Navy harbor tug in service from 1944 to 1946 and from 1953 to 1975, also was named for him.

== Chief Washakie Foundation ==
The Chief Washakie Foundation was founded in 2004. It supports educational programs and research into the history and cultural traditions of the Shoshone and Arapaho of Central Wyoming and advocates for Native American education. As of April 2013 Washakie's great-great-grandson James Trosper serves as chair and executive director.

== Notes ==
- Shimkin, Demitri B. "Eastern Shoshone." Warren L. d'Azevedo, volume editor. Handbook of North American Indians: Great Basin, Volume 11. Washington, DC: Smithsonian Institution, 1986: 308–335. ISBN 978-0-16-004581-3.
