= Eva McAdams =

Shoshone regalia maker

- Born: Eva B. St. Clair Washakie; June 18, 1927; Fort Washakie, Wyoming
- Died: January 29, 2010 (aged 82); Fort Washakie, Wyoming
- Citizenship: Eastern Shoshone
- Occupations: Needleworker and beading artist
- Known for: Shoshone regalia maker
- Spouse(s): Alfred "Dutch" McAdams, married 1945
- Children: 8
- Parent(s): Lynn and Eloise Sonnicant St. Clair
- Family: Washakie
- Awards: National Heritage Fellowship

Eva B. St. Clair Washakie McAdams (June 18, 1927 – January 29, 2010) was a Shoshone regalia maker and beadwork artist. Born on Wyoming's Wind River Reservation, McAdams was named a Fellow by the National Endowment for the Arts in 1996.

== Biography ==
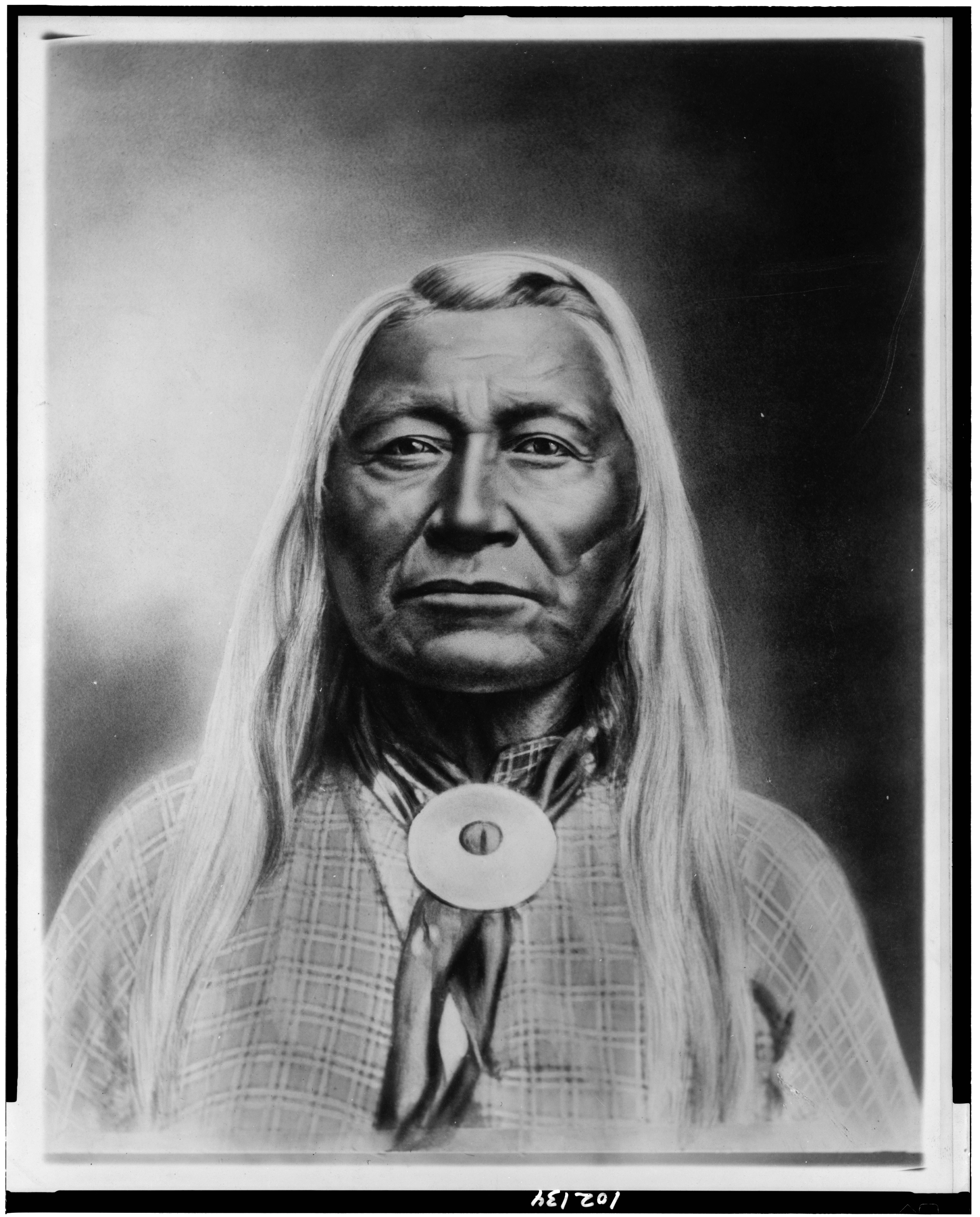
Portrait of McAdam's great-grandfather, Washakie, Chief of Shoshones

=== Early life ===
Eva B. St. Clair Washakie was born in Fort Washakie, on the Wind River Reservation in Wyoming on June 18, 1927. She was the second oldest of eight children, and a great-granddaughter of Chief Washakie, a Shoshone leader. As a child, she learned the tradition of Shoshone needlework and beading on buckskin from her mother, grandmother Mary Washakie and aunt. Buckskin sewing was historically regarded as a survival skill amongst the Shoshone, and today has grown into a ceremonial role.

=== Beading and needlework ===
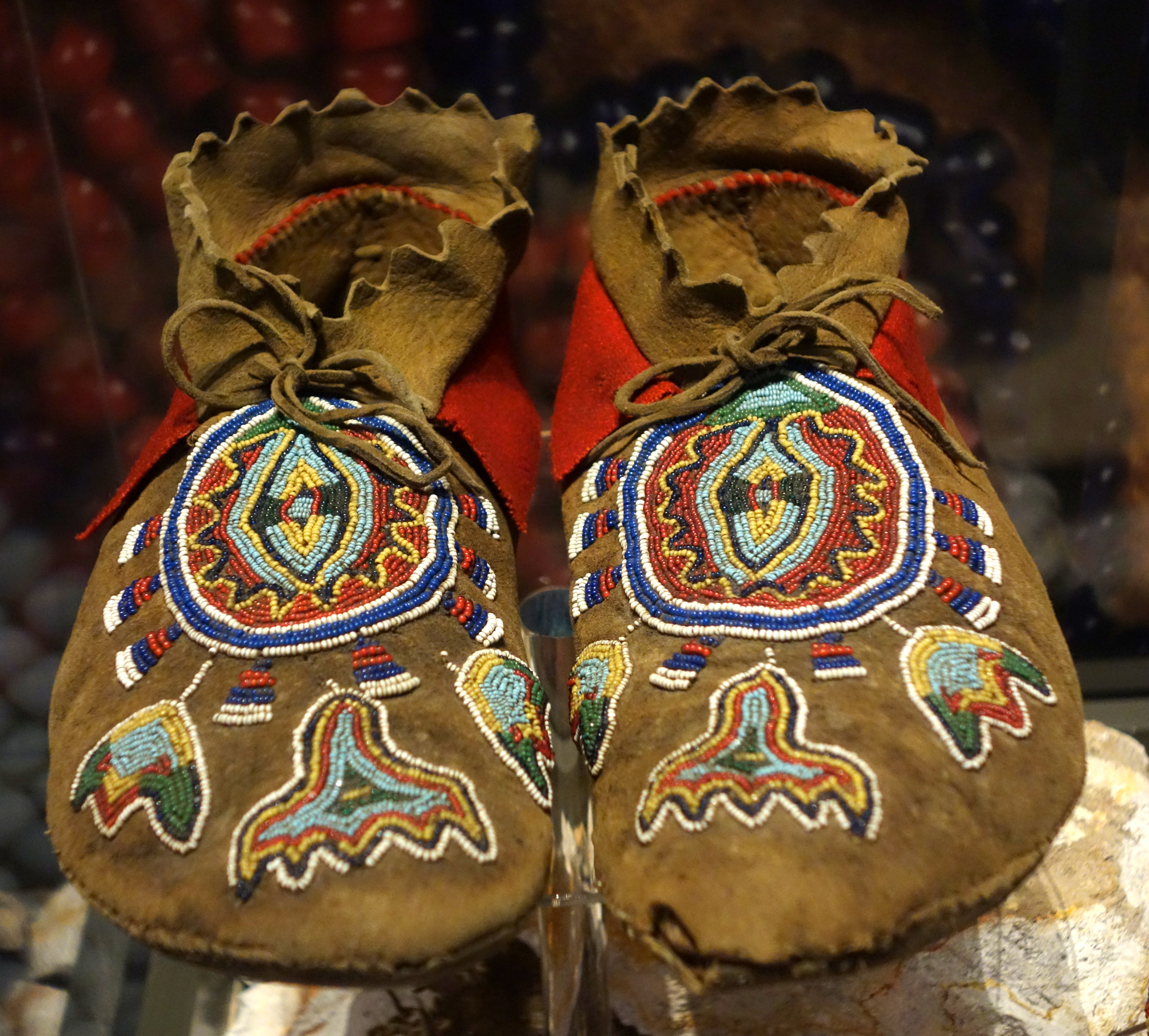
Historical example of Shoshone moccasins displaying the tribe's traditional beadwork

In 1945, Eva married her husband Alfred "Dutch" McAdams. The couple operated a ranch in Wind River, and Eva practiced her needlework in her free time. To support her family, McAdams worked several jobs, such as operating a native crafts store and for the Bureau of Indian Affairs while raising eight children. McAdam's reputation began to grow for her traditional designs on buckskin, used for Shoshone ceremony. McAdams became particularly known for her Shoshone Rose and floral motifs, which she claimed were inspired by advertisements.

McAdams said, "Sacajawea and the Shoshones considered the rose the world's most beautiful flower. That's why they selected it for beading. It represents goodness and love".

=== Recognition and legacy ===
In 1990, she received the Wyoming Governor's Art Award, and was the first Native artist to be honored with the award. In 1996, she was awarded a National Heritage Fellowship by the National Endowment for the Arts. McAdams taught her traditional needlework to her children and grandchildren.

McAdams died in Fort Washakie on January 29, 2010. Today, her granddaughter Joanne Brings Thunder continues her grandmother's needlework and beading traditions.
