= Cotsiogo =

Eastern Shoshone artist (c. 1866–1912)

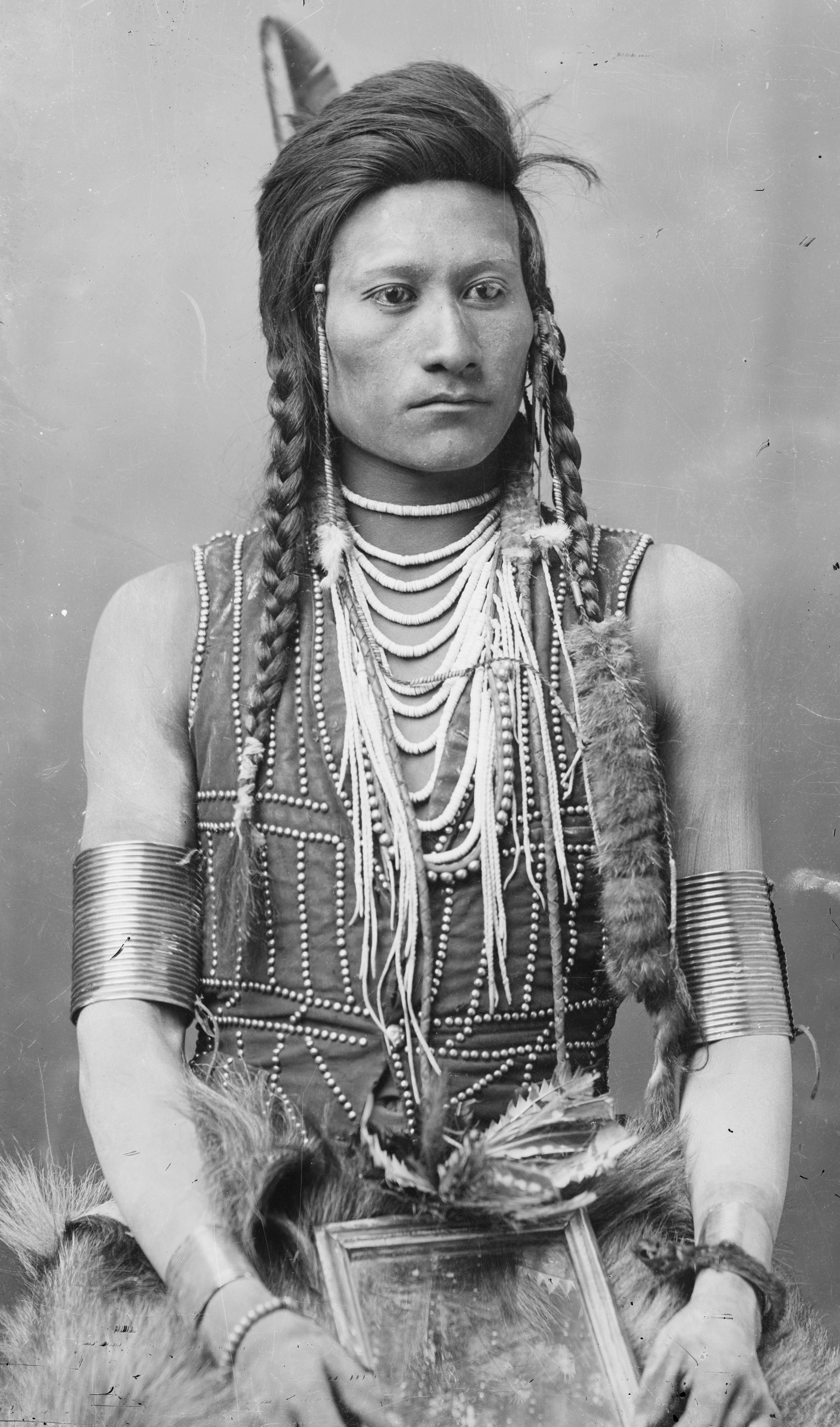
- Cotsiogo, photographed prior to 1898
- Born: c. 1866
- Died: 1912 (aged 45–46)
- Other names: Codsiogo, Katsikodi, Cadzi Cody
- Occupation: Artist
- Known for: Hide paintings
- Parent: Washakie

Cotsiogo (c. 1866–1912), also known as Codsiogo, Katsikodi, or Cadzi Cody, was an Eastern Shoshone artist known for his hide paintings. He lived on the Wind River Indian Reservation in Wyoming.

== Early life ==
Born in the 1860s, Cotsiogo was a son of Eastern Shoshone leader Washakie. During Cotsiogo's lifetime, the tribe was placed on the Wind River Indian Reservation in the Wyoming Territory, a reservation established by the Fort Bridger Treaty of 1868.

== Work ==
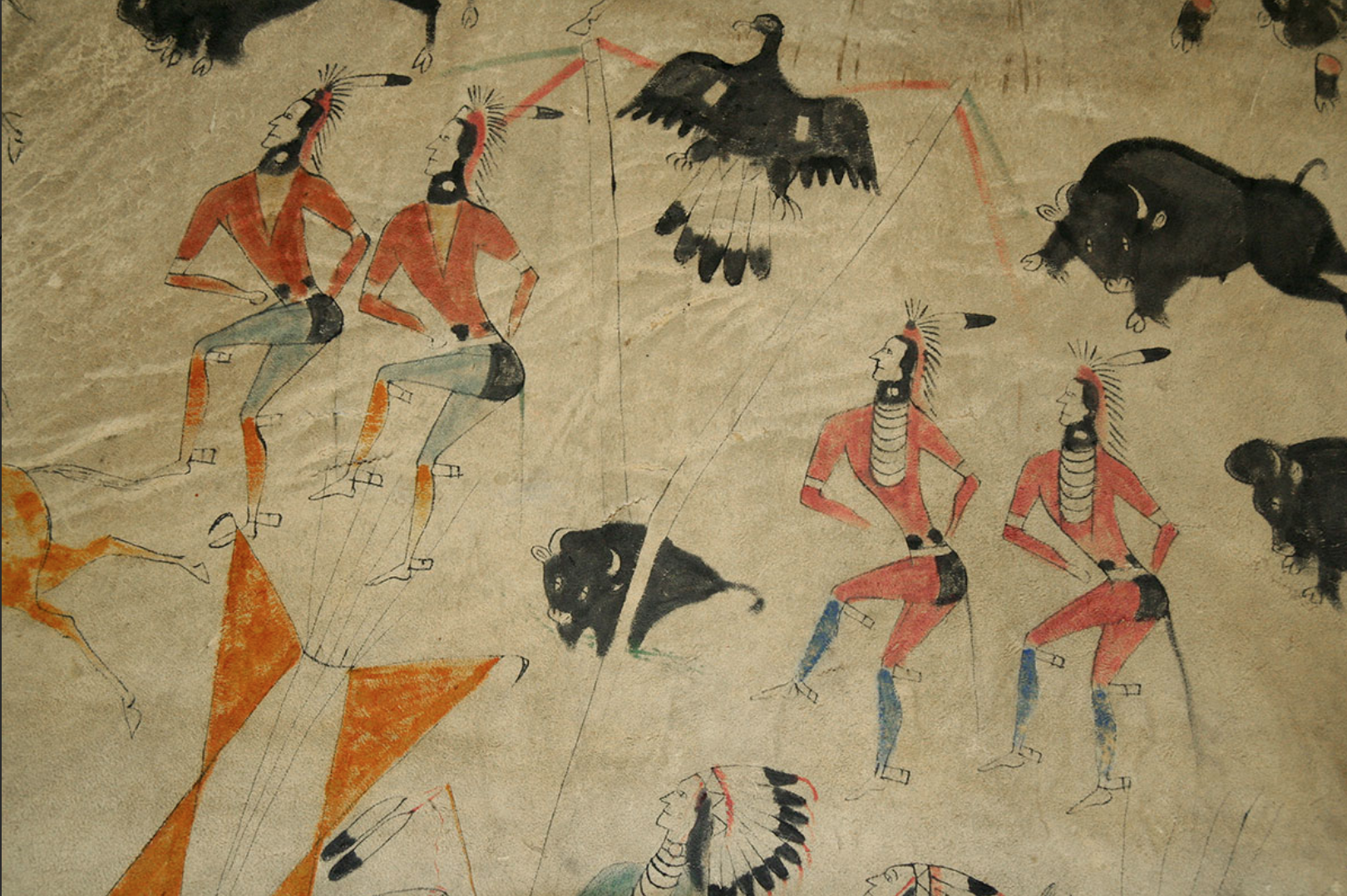
Elk hide painting by Cotsiogo.

Cotsiogo was known for his paintings on animal hides, including elk hide. His earliest paintings had depictions of the Wolf (War) Dance with a US flag at the center of the piece. The Shoshone Wolf Dance evolved into the Grass Dance, with men dancers going from having "one or two feathers in their hair to war bonnets with long streamers and feather bustles". Depictions of the Wolf Dance were quickly replaced by the Sun Dance, Grass Dance, and buffalo hunts. Cotsiogo, who sold his paintings to white tourists visiting the Wind River Reservation, included scenes of traditional buffalo hunts because they were seen as more desirable by buyers. Thanks to the tourist economy, new trade markets, and the influx of new materials, artists like Cotsiogo were able to produce works that helped support themselves and their families.
