= Statue of Washakie =

Sculpture by Dave McGary in multiple versions

Chief Washakie
- The statue in the United States Capitol Visitor Center in 2023
- Artist: Dave McGary
- Subject: Washakie
- Location: Cheyenne, Wyoming; Fort Washakie, Wyoming; Laramie, Wyoming; Washington, D.C., United States

The sculptor Dave McGary has created a standing statue of Chief Washakie, leader of the Shoshone people, in multiple versions, as well as an equestrian statue (titled Battle of Two Hearts) of the same subject.

== Washington, D.C. ==
One bronze sculpture is installed in the United States Capitol Visitor Center's Emancipation Hall, in Washington, D.C., as part of the National Statuary Hall Collection. The statue was gifted by the U.S. state of Wyoming in 2000.

== Wyoming ==
Statue on the University of Wyoming campus, 2005

In Cheyenne, Wyoming, a statue of Washakie by McGary (a duplicate of the one in the U.S. Capitol) is located at the Wyoming State Capitol in Cheyenne. This sculpture was installed in 2001.

Another statue is at Fort Washakie on the Wind River Indian Reservation, near Fort Washakie, Wyoming.

Another sculpture by McGary, a 24-foot sculpture entitled Battle of Two Hearts, executed in bronze, was installed at the University of Wyoming campus in Laramie, Wyoming in 2005. It depicted a mounted Washakie at the Battle of Crowheart Butte.

== See also ==
- 2000 in art
- Native Americans in popular culture
