= Trosper =

Trosper may refer to:

- Trosper, Kentucky
- Trosper Lake, a lake in Washington

== People with the surname ==
- Guy Trosper (1911–1963), American screenwriter
- James Trosper, Native American tribal rights advocate
- Justin Trosper (born 1972), American musician
- Terrie Trosper (1969–1991)
