= Big Robber =

Crow tribe leader

Chief Big Robber
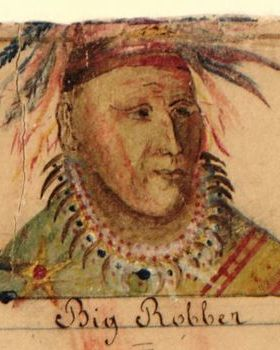
- Robber depicted in 1851. Painting by Jesuit missionary Pierre-Jean De Smet
- Died: 1858 or 1866
- Other names: Big Shadow, Big Robert
- Occupation: 19th century Crow chief

Chief Big Robber (died 1858 or 1866), also known as Big Shadow or Big Robert, was a 19th century Crow chief. He was a participant in the Fort Laramie Treaty of 1851. His name Big Shadow referred to his large stature.

== Biography ==
Big Robber had a brother named Dancing White Horse, who was killed by the Lakota in 1844. As a result, Big Robber performed a seven-day long Sun Dance. In 1851, as leader of the Mountain Crow band, he participated in the Laramie Treaty. United States Commissioners appointed Big Robber as head chief of the entire nation. He negotiated with Chief Red Fish of the Lakota, who was also a participant in the 1851 Fort Laramie Treaty, to establish regional boundaries. After the treaty, Big Robber lost much respect and was disliked by other Crow bands. In 1858, the Lakota began to advance into Crow territory. Big Robber was killed that year after a battle that left 30 Crow dead.

An alternate legend surrounding the death of Big Robber concerns the naming of Crowheart Butte in Wyoming. The butte was allegedly named after an 1866 duel between Big Robber and Chief Washakie of the Eastern Shoshones. In the legend, the two fought to decide hunting rights in the Wind River Range. Chief Washakie slew Chief Robber, but was so impressed with his courage, he cut out Robber's heart and placed it on the end of his lance.
