= James Trosper =

Eastern Shoshone Sun Dance chief

- Eastern Shoshone Sun Dance Chief
- Occupations: advocate of tribal rights and traditions
- Spouse: Theresa

James Trosper is the current Eastern Shoshone Sun Dance chief. He is widely regarded as “a respected voice on traditional Plains Indian spirituality.” He is Director of the High Plains American Indian Research Institute. HPAIRI facilitates a wide variety of partnerships between the University of Wyoming and the tribes of the Wind River Indian Reservation in Fort Washakie, Wyoming “to work together in ways that empower tribes, nurture innovation for American Indian sustainability, and demonstrate respect for Native peoples’ cultures, traditions, laws, and diverse expressions of sovereignty.”

Mr. Trosper grew up in a Shoshone community and in a Shoshone home upholding the traditional Shoshone ceremonial beliefs and practices. His mother is Shoshone and his father was Arapaho.

Since 1993 James Trosper has been the Sun Dance Chief and Ceremonial leader of the Eastern Shoshone tribe on the Wind River Reservation. Trosper promotes spiritual healing, traditional ceremonies and a positive mindset for addressing injustices and overcoming challenges. Trosper is an active member of the Native American community.

== Biography ==
Trosper holds a Bachelor's degree from the University of Wyoming, and has completed coursework for Master of Arts degrees in Social Work and Counseling. As an undergraduate, he served as a Senator on the Associated Students of University of Wyoming.

He was appointed as a member of the University of Wyoming Board of Trustees by Gov. Jim Geringer in 2002 and reappointed by Gov. Dave Freudenthal in 2007. His second term expired in 2013.

Trosper served as director of the Northern Arapaho Department of Family Services for nine years. He also served as Director of Indian Child Welfare for the Northern Arapaho Tribe for 14 years.

In 2016, Trosper became director of the High Plains American Indian Research Institute (HPAIRI) at the University of Wyoming. In 2017, he took on a secondary role as director of the Native American Education, Research and Cultural Center at the University of Wyoming. He left the latter role in 2018 to serve exclusively as director of HPAIRI where he facilitates connections between researchers and the Eastern Shoshone and Northern Arapaho on the Wind River Indian Reservation. Trosper consults with researchers to clarify how working on tribal lands means conducting research in a manner reflective of tribal tradition and sovereignty. Trosper coordinates meetings with tribal elders and tribal leadership to approve proposed research; helps navigate data collection and dissemination in an appropriate manner; and works with tribes and researchers to address intellectual property rights and informed consent.

Currently, he is on the Awards Committee of the Chief Washakie Memorial Endowment at the University of Wyoming Foundation. Trosper, as Chair and Executive Director of the Chief Washakie Foundation, helped lead the creation of this endowment, which was valued at $545,000 in 2018 and as of 2016 had supported 167 students with nearly $249,000 in scholarships. The Chief Washakie Foundation supports educational programs and research into the history and cultural traditions of the Shoshone and Arapaho of Central Wyoming and advocates for Native American education.

Trosper also served on the Grand Teton National Park Foundation Board from 2004 to 2008. In the past he has served on the Chief Washakie Sculpture Committee that dedicated a sculpture in the United States Capitol Rotunda in 2000, the Board of Directors of the Wind River Youth Council, and the Fremont County Historic Preservation Commission. Trosper was appointed by Governor Sullivan to the Wyoming Indian Affairs Council and served as the Chairman.

== Sun Dance ==
Trosper is responsible for holding the Eastern Shoshone Sun Dance each August on the Wind River Indian Reservation. This duty was passed down to Trosper through genealogical lines for seven generations, and also includes receiving and caring for a medicine bundle used in the ceremony. Trosper received the leadership of the Sun Dance through the line of his great-grandfather John Trehero (sometimes spelled Truhujo), who led the ceremony for much of the 20th century and authorized a branch of the Sun Dance on the Crow Reservation in 1941 to be led by Tom Yellowtail (Crow).

Trehero died in 1986. According to a vision Trehero had experienced, in 1993 Tom Yellowtail conducted a blessing ceremony for James Trosper in order to pass authority for the Trehero Sun Dance for the Eastern Shoshone to Trosper. After attending a Crow Sun Dance led by Yellowtail in the Wolf Teeth (Chetish) Mountains of Montana in 1993, Trosper led his first Eastern Shoshone Sun Dance in 1994, with assistance of Yellowtail from outside the Sun Dance lodge. Yellowtail died the following month, having fulfilled his last promise to Trehero of passing along the Eastern Shoshone Sun Dance lineage. The two Trehero-descended Sun Dances among the Crow and the Eastern Shoshone continue to this day.

Predecessor Eastern Shoshone Sun Dance leaders going back before Trehero included John McAdams, Andrew Bresil, Wuwuci and Bazil (Pa:si). Trosper is also a descendant of Yellow Hand (Ohamagwya), who founded the Sun Dance among the Shoshone.

== Work with University of Wyoming ==
While serving as a university trustee, Trosper performed a cedaring ceremony at the unveiling of the "Battle of Two Hearts" sculpture of Chief Washakie in 2005, located in front of Washakie Dining Center at the University of Wyoming campus in Laramie. Sculptor Dave McGary said, "The heart and soul of the Battle of Two Hearts was James Trosper, who was the visionary for this monument, providing his personal leadership, working with both the University of Wyoming and the Wyoming State Legislature. It was due to his dedicated efforts that the monument was purchased by the State of Wyoming and gifted to the University of Wyoming."

In 2017, former University of Wyoming President Laurie Nichols tapped Trosper to lead a new Native American advisory committee to boost Native enrollment and expand partnerships with the Eastern Shoshone and Northern Arapaho. Trosper noted his disappointment with the departure of Nichols in 2018.

In 2017, Trosper was part of the committee that inaugurated the new Native American Research Education and Cultural Center in Laramie, a project that had been hoped for and discussed for decades. As of 2020 Trosper served on three other committees at the University of Wyoming: UW Engagement Council, Native American Affairs Advisory Council, and the Council on Diversity, Equity and Inclusion. In 2017-2018 he was part of the state of Wyoming's American Indian Education for All content review committee.

Since becoming full-time director of the High Plains American Indian Research Institute in 2018, Trosper has overseen projects such as the first map of indigenous place names in Wyoming, and a National Endowment for the Humanities project investigating the cultural role of elk on the Wind River Indian Reservation, and several economic development projects. He was preceded as director of HPAIRI by Dr. Judith Antell, who launched the NEH elk project. As the director of HPAIRI Trosper works to increase American Indian enrollment, assist researchers to serve stated needs of the Wind River Indian Reservation, and promote education and economic development.

Trosper helped launch a new format for the Native American Scholarship and Awards Banquet at the University of Wyoming in 2019.

Trosper has appeared at many conferences and summits on topics ranging from education to water law. He was a keynote speaker at the 2019 Native Business Summit.

== Ancestry ==
Trosper traces his ancestry to noted American Indian leaders who valued education as a means of defending tribal sovereignty during American expansion in the 1800s.

Trosper is the great-great grandson of Chief Washakie of the Eastern Shoshone, who emphasized the importance of education, and was responsible for the 1868 negotiations with the United States that created the Wind River Indian Reservation. Washakie was trilingual, speaking Shoshone, French, and English, which he learned from trapping alongside people like Jim Bridger during the 1830s fur trade era. Washakie is quoted as saying, "I fought to keep our land, our water and our hunting grounds -- today, education is the weapon my people need to protect them."

Trosper is also descended from Northern Arapaho leader Warshinun, known as Friday. Until the late 1860s, Friday's band lived in the area of northern Colorado where the city of Fort Collins is located. In 1831 the nine-year-old Warshinun was found alone on the plains by fur trapper and trader Thomas Fitzpatrick, who gave him the English name "Friday." The trapper took Friday to St. Louis where he was educated and became fluent in English. Friday returned to his Arapaho family at age 14, and served the Northern Arapaho as translator in many 19th century negotiations with the United States alongside Chief Black Coal and Chief Sharp Nose.

== Public Appearances ==
Trosper has made many public statements in the media, often with a positive approach to addressing the challenges Tribal communities face. In 2006, he said of a drug bust on the Wind River Indian Reservation: "This probably seems like a negative thing, but I think it shows everybody, especially those who are involved with trafficking meth, that we don't want meth on the reservation, and we are an example of people really fighting hard to get rid of this problem."

Trosper has spoken extensively on Eastern Shoshone spirituality and cultural traditions in Sweden, England, France, Italy, Switzerland, and many states. He discussed new ways of finding healing in a skateboarding film by Jackson Tisi called "Good Medicine" that was produced for Facebook. He has also used ceremonies to help guide new initiatives on the reservation, including a 2003 effort by the University of Utah to institute colon cancer screenings.

Trosper advocates for education as a form of community development and economic development, which can help Tribal communities overcome what he calls a "culture of dependency" that he says resulted from federal policies: “I think that was their intention because through that cultural dependency, they were able to control the tribes. So, if any of the young men went out and attacked settlers, then the government can come back and say, ‘Well, we are going to withhold your rations for this month.’ The whole tribe paid the price and put pressure on those young men not to attack the settlers. It was really a way of controlling the tribes. We really want to go back to the way that we were before when we were entrepreneurs and provide for ourselves,” he adds. “So, I think that process really begins with education and some of the other partnerships that the University of Wyoming is providing to the Wind River Reservation.”

When Trosper's nephew Stallone Trosper was murdered in 2015 by a City of Riverton employee in a substance abuse treatment center, Trosper led ceremonies to bring the family together. In a public statement, he tried to make sense of the tragedy, putting it in the context of racial tensions in a reservation border town that sits squarely in the Wind River Indian Reservation and the Shoshone homeland: “Why did this happen, and will anyone care? People need to know what kind of person he [Stallone Trosper] was. He had qualities that we should all emulate…. He can’t have died for no reason. Something good must come. It really is hard, this hatred and misunderstanding that we call racism. It’s hard…. Riverton is in the middle of the reservation. The people who hate us have the whole rest of the world to live in. But this is our home. My [great, great] grandfather negotiated for this place, so that we would have a home forever. We’re not going anywhere. If you want to live with us, and learn from us, and respect our ways, then we welcome you. We open our homes. That is our way. That has always been our way. We are a loving, welcoming people, all native people. But why come here if you hate us?”

Like his ancestor Chief Washakie, Trosper has criticized federal government policies when he felt it was warranted. In speaking about the 2019 government shutdown, he said, "My great-great-grandfather signed a treaty, and there were agreements in that treaty. We've lived up to our end of it. Chief Washakie gave up a lot of land. My personal opinion is that the federal government needs to live up to their end of it."

== Bibliography & Awards ==
- Native Spirit and The Sun Dance Way DVD [interview] (World Wisdom, 2007)
- Native Spirit and The Sun Dance Way [interview] (World Wisdom, 2007) ISBN 978-1-933316-27-7
- Indian Spirit [foreword] (World Wisdom, 2006) ISBN 978-1-933316-19-2
- “Foreword” & Contributor to Living in Two Worlds: The American Indian Experience, by Charles Eastman
- 2003 Wyoming State Historical Society Award for Professional Documentary: Washakie: Last Chief of the Eastern Shoshone, co-produced with Kyle Nicholoff
