= Plains hide painting =

Artistic practice of Plains Indians

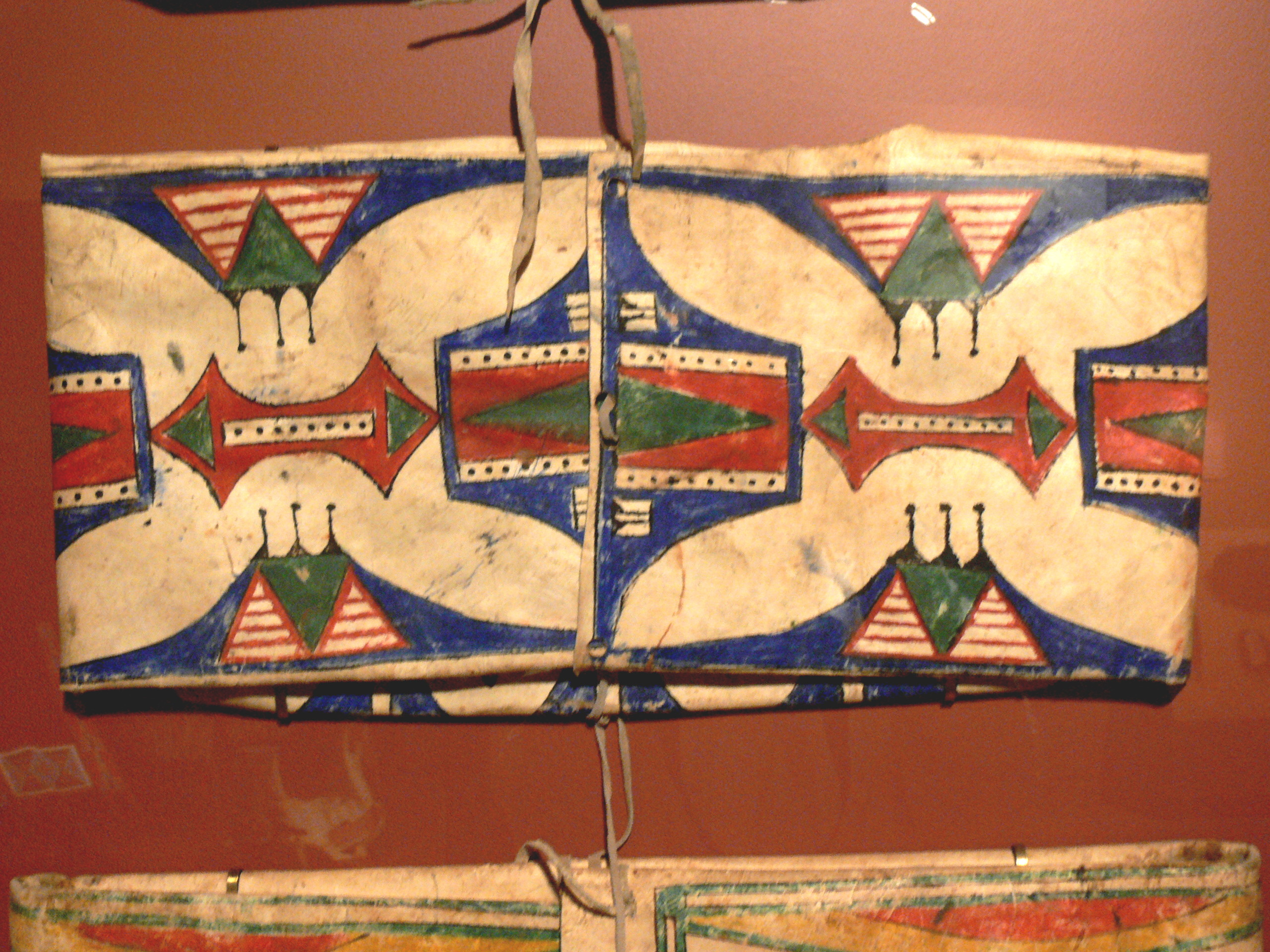
Sioux parfleche, ca. 1900, Gilcrease Museum

Plains hide painting is a traditional North American Plains Indian artistic practice of painting on either tanned or raw animal hides. Tipis, tipi liners, shields, parfleches, robes, clothing, drums, and winter counts could all be painted.

== Genres ==
Art historian Joyce Szabo writes that Plains artists were concerned "with composition, balance, symmetry, and variety." Designs can be similar to those found in earlier rock art and later quillwork and beadwork.

=== Geometric painting ===
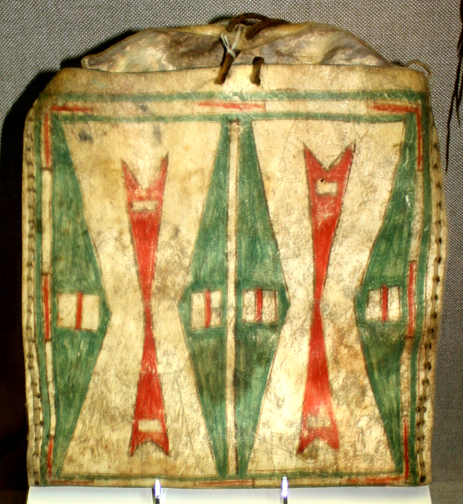
Kiowa parfleche, ca. 1890, Oklahoma History Center

Plains women traditionally paint abstract, geometric designs. Bright colors were preferred and areas were filled with solid fields of color. Cross-hatching was a last resort used only when paint was scarce. Negative space was important and designs were discussed by women in terms of their negative space. Dots are used to break up large areas.

Buffalo robes and parfleches were frequently painted with geometrical patterns. Parfleches are rawhide envelopes for carrying and storing goods, including food. Their painted designs are thought to be stylized maps, featuring highly abstract geographic features such as rivers or mountains.

The "Feathered Sun" is a reoccurring motif of stylized feathers in several concentric circles. It visually connects a feather warbonnet to the sun.

=== Representational painting ===
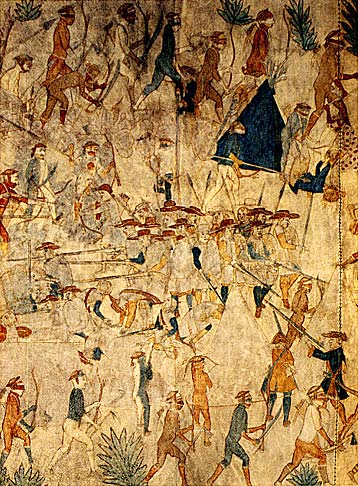
Buffalo hide painting of Pawnees battling the Villasur expedition

Traditionally, men painted representational art. They painted living things. Plains Indian male artists use a system of pictographic signs, characterized by two-dimensionality, readily recognizable by other members of their tribe. This picture writing could be used for anything from directions and maps to love letters. Images were streamlined and backgrounds were minimal for clarity. Representational painting typically fell into two categories: heraldic accounts or calendars.

==== Heraldic painting ====
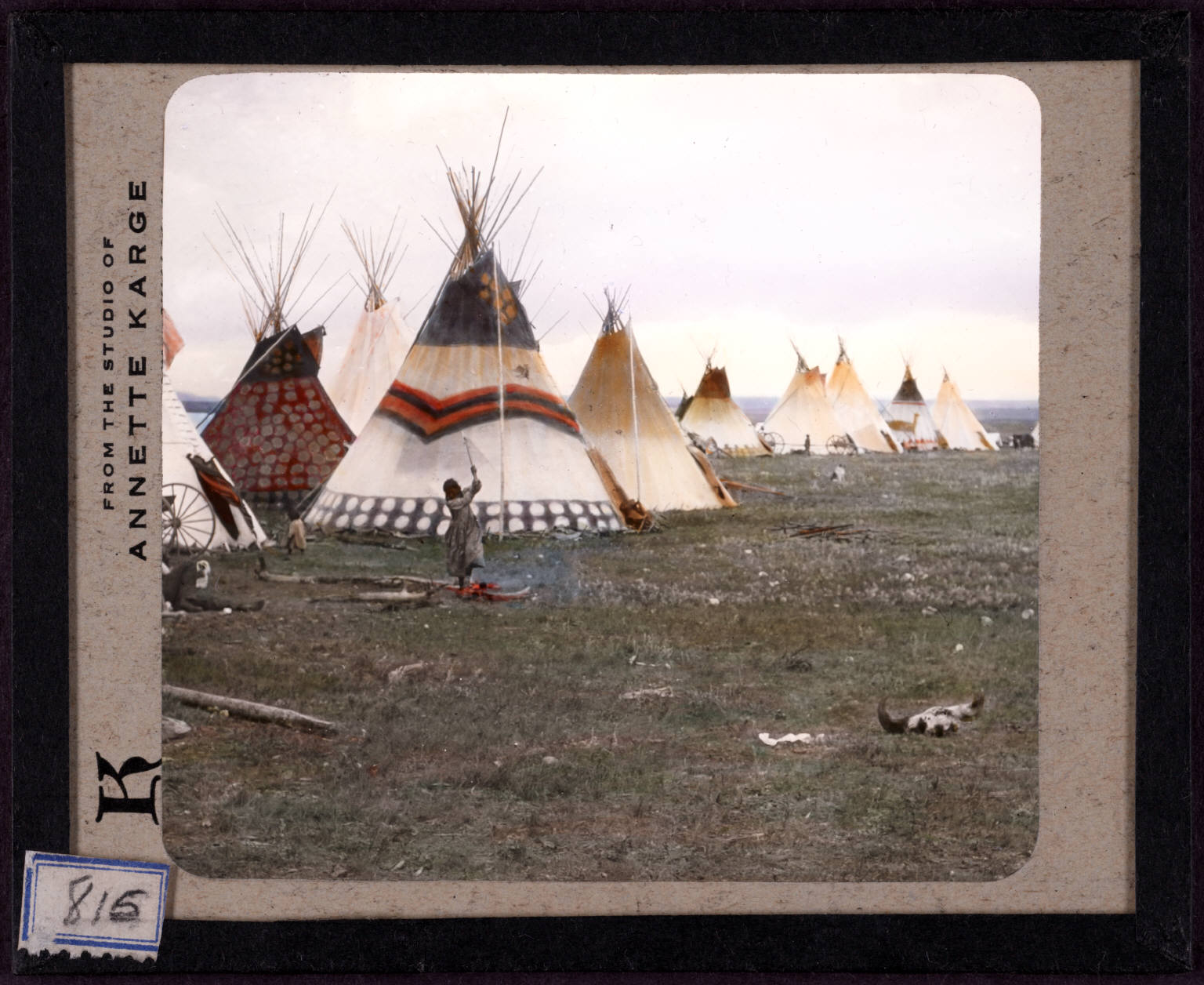
Siksika tipis in Montana, photo by Walter McClintock

Men recorded their battle and hunting exploits on hide tipi liners, robes, and even shirts. Figures were scattered across the hide and semi-transparent images sometimes overlapped each other. Narrative hides were often read right to left, with the protagonist emerging from the right. Allies are on the right with enemies on the left. Men and horses were commonly painted, and other popular motifs included footprints, hoofprints, name glyphs, bullets, and arrows. An 1868 Blackfoot buffalo hide features the protagonist no fewer than eight times.

Painted hides also commemorate historical events, such as treaty signings.

After 1850, hide painting grew in complexity with finer lines and additional details added. Introduced technologies influenced hide painting, and a 19th-century Omaha tipi featured steamboats.

==== Calendars ====
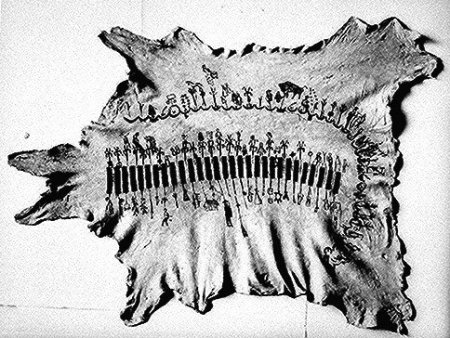
Kiowa winter count by Anko, ca. 1895

Traditional Plains calendars are called winter counts because among most Plains tribes they feature a single pictogram that defined the entire year. Prior to using the Gregorian calendar, Lakota people counted years from first snow to first snow. Kiowas were unique in choosing two images per year– one for the winter and one representing the summer Sun Dance.

Before the late 19th century, when buffalo were still plentiful, winter counts were painted on buffalo hides. When buffalo became scarce, artists began using paper provided by settlers.

=== Visionary painting ===
Visions and dreams could inspire designs. Buckskin covers for circular rawhide hide shields, in particular, are inspired by men's visions and can include paintings of humans, animals, or spirit beings, reflecting the owner's personal powers and providing protection. Designs could be obtained from the warriors who received the visions or from medicine men. Cheyenne men who received visions were allowed to make four shields with the design. Among the Kiowa and Kiowa-Apache about 50 possible shield designs existed.

Tipis could be painted with visionary designs. The design and related power belonged to the tipi-owner, which could be transferred by inheritance, marriage, or, among some tribes such as the Blackfeet, sale.

Followers of the Ghost dance religion painted visionary designs on their clothing. Arapaho and Lakota ghost dance shirts were painted with crows, magpies, turtles, and cedar trees.

== Process and materials ==
Buffalo hides, as well as deer, elk, and other animal hides, are painted. Clothing and robes are often brain-tanned to be soft and supple. Parfleches, shields, and moccasin soles are rawhide for toughness.

In the past, Plains artists used a bone or wood stylus to paint with natural mineral and vegetable pigments. Sections of buffalo rib could be ground to expose the marrow, which was absorbent and worked like a contemporary ink marker. Swelling cottonwood buds provided brown pigment. Lakota artists used to burn yellow clay to produce ceremonial red paint. Lakotas associated blue pigments with women.

In earlier times, all members of a tribe might paint but highly skilled individuals might be commissioned by others to create artwork. Before the 20th century, when a Kiowa man needed to repaint his lodge, he would invite 20-30 friends to paint the entire tipi in a single day. He would then treat them all to a feast.

== Related art forms ==
Many tribes throughout North America, besides those on the Plains, also painted hides, following different aesthetic traditions. Subarctic tribes are known for their painted caribou hides. On the Plains, when buffalo herds were being slaughtered in the late 19th century, other painting surfaces became available, such as muslin, paper, and canvas, giving birth to Ledger art. Contemporary Plains beadwork and jewelry used designs from hide painting.

== Gallery ==
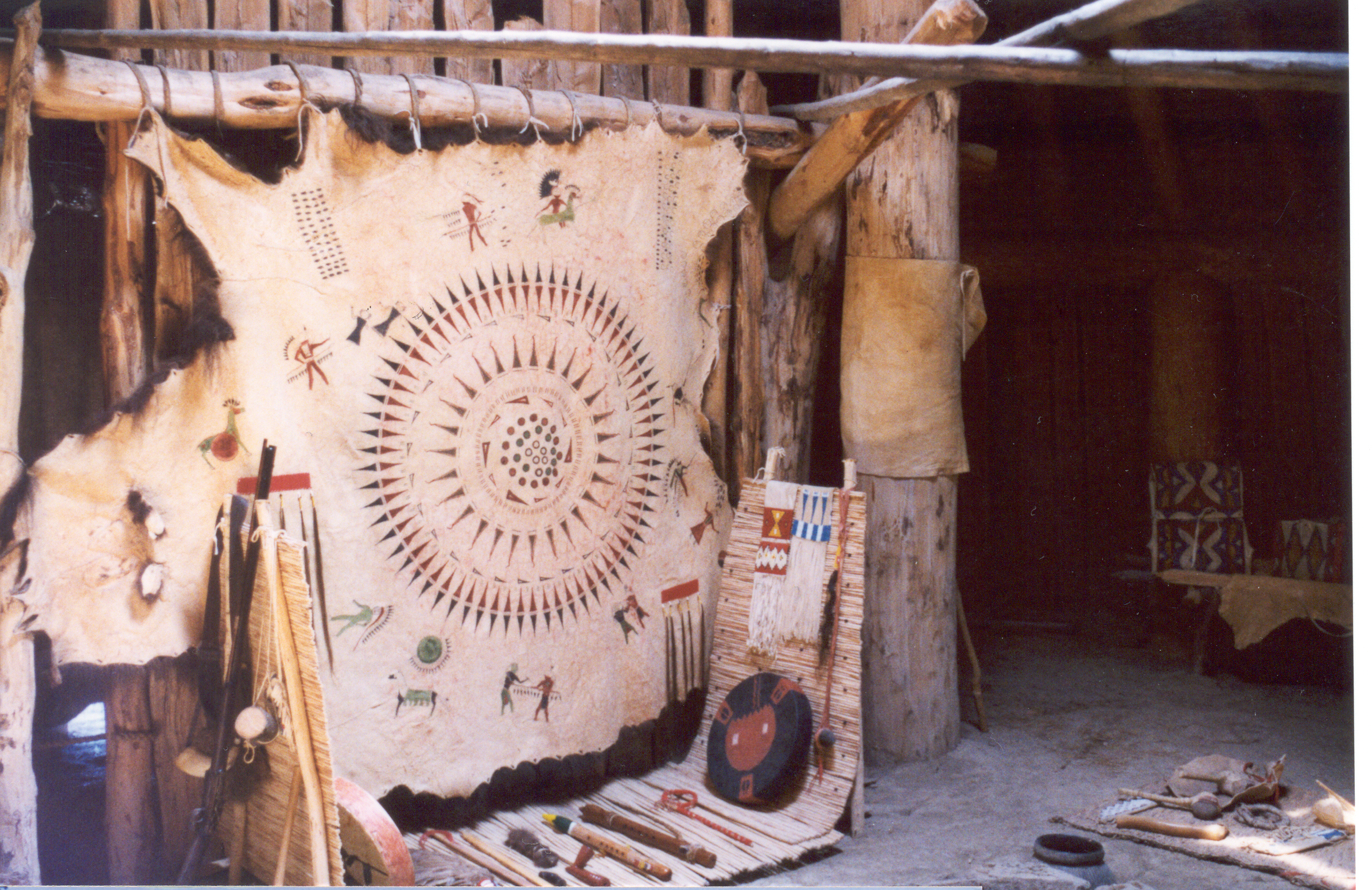
Knife River Villages buffalo robe featuring the "Feathered Sun" motif, photo by Chris Light

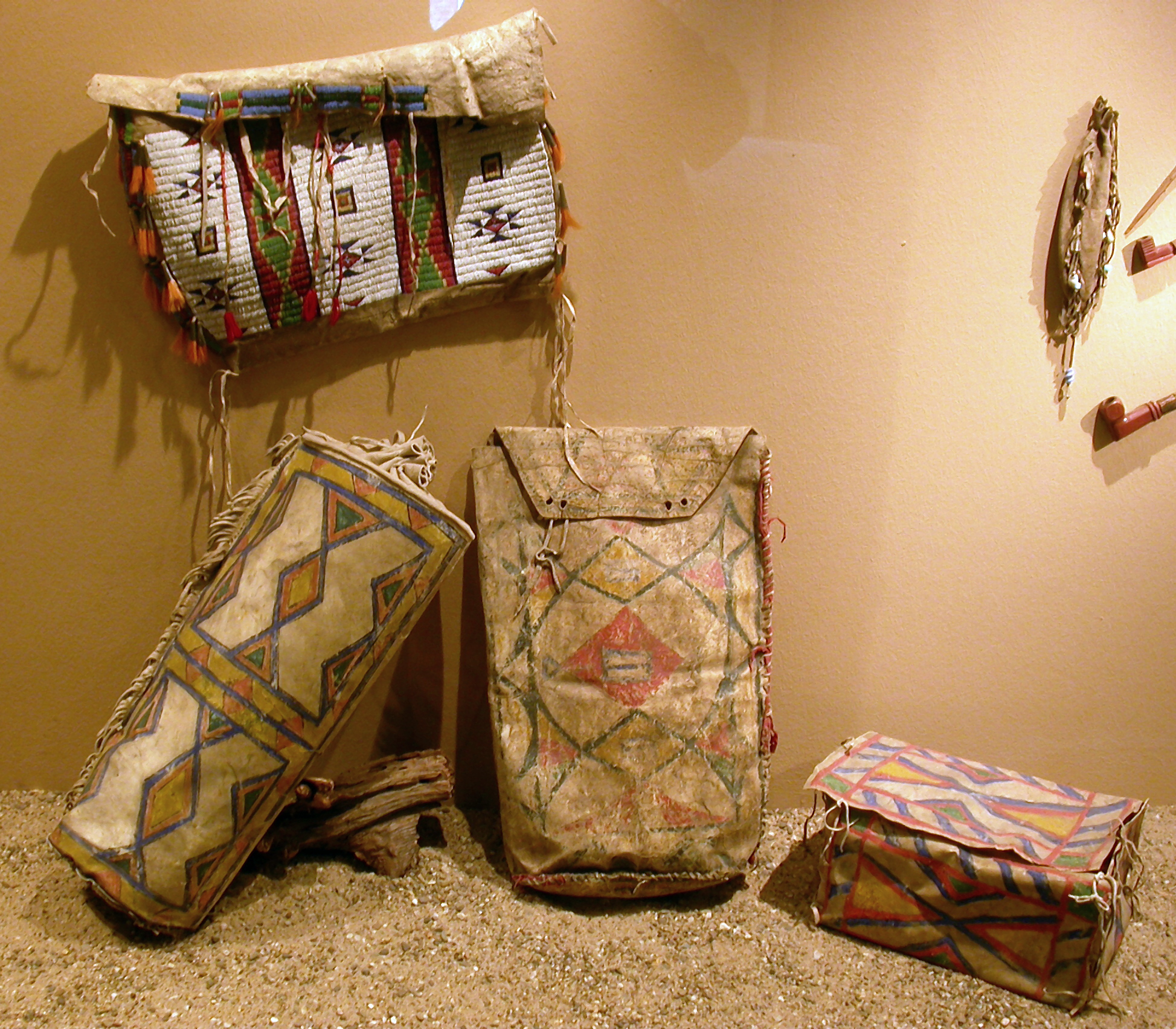
Sioux beaded and painted rawhide parfleches

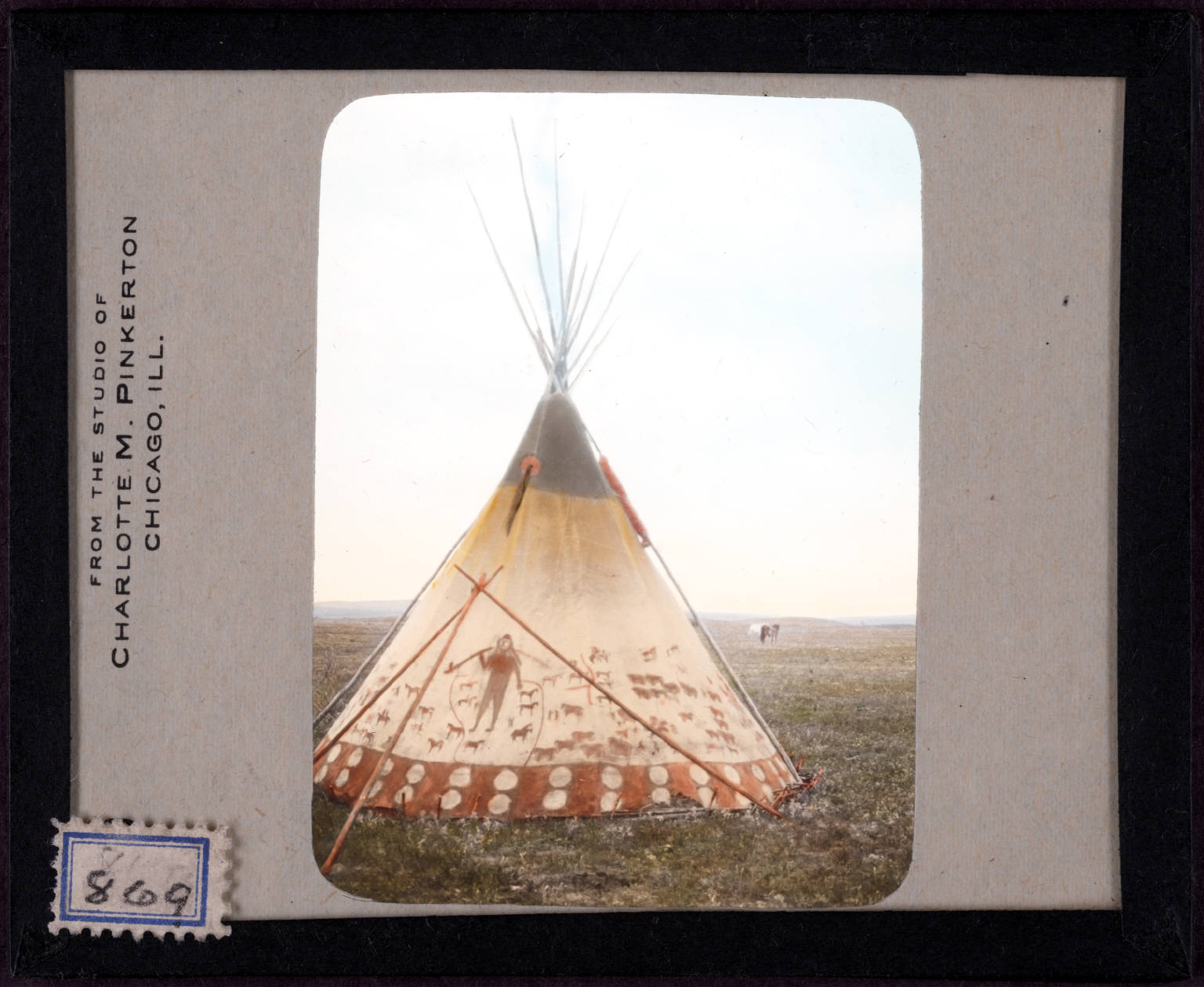
Siksika war tipi, Montana, by McClintock

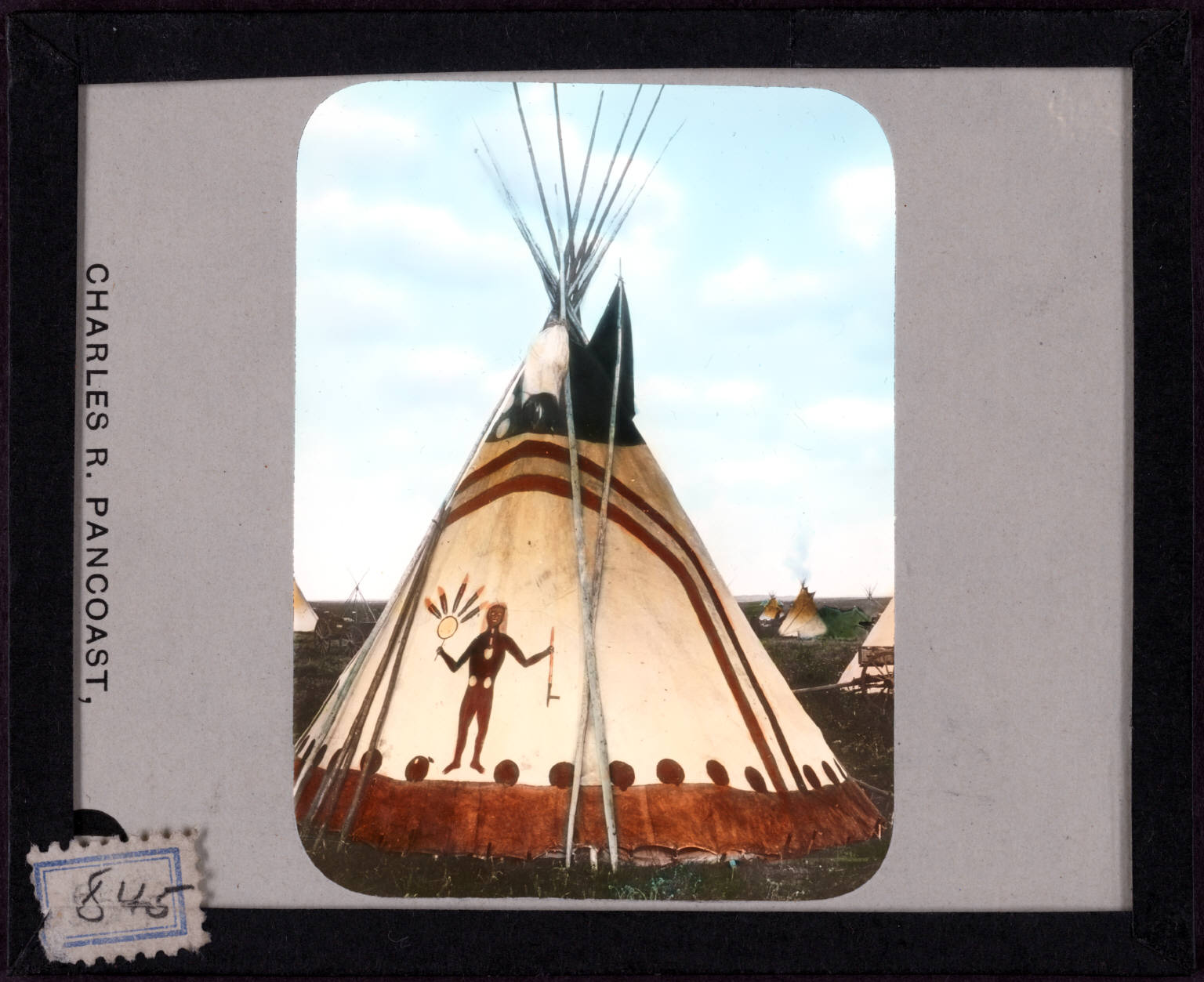
Siksika rainbow tipi, Montana, by McClintock

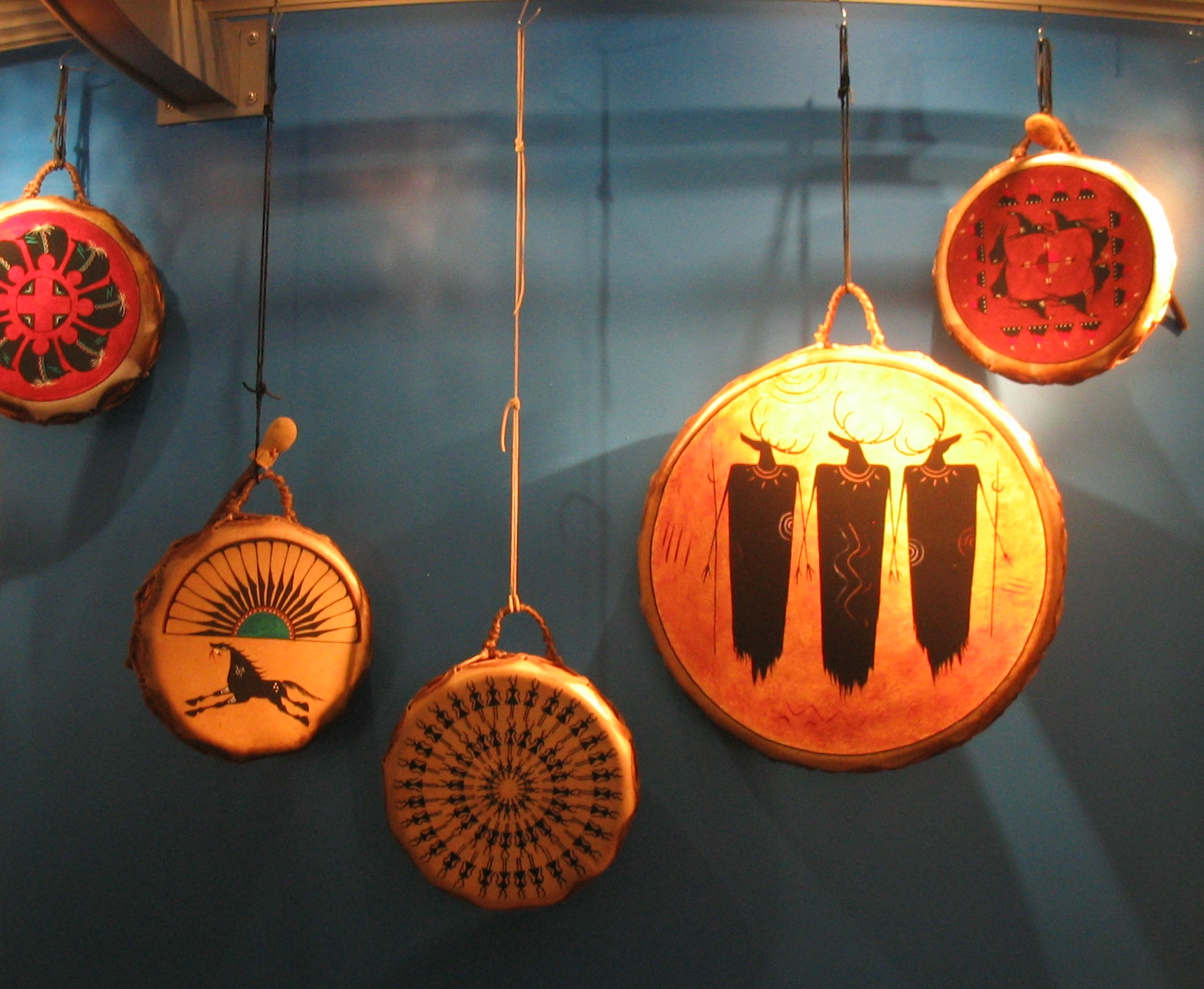
Contemporary painted rawhide hand drums, National Museum of the American Indian

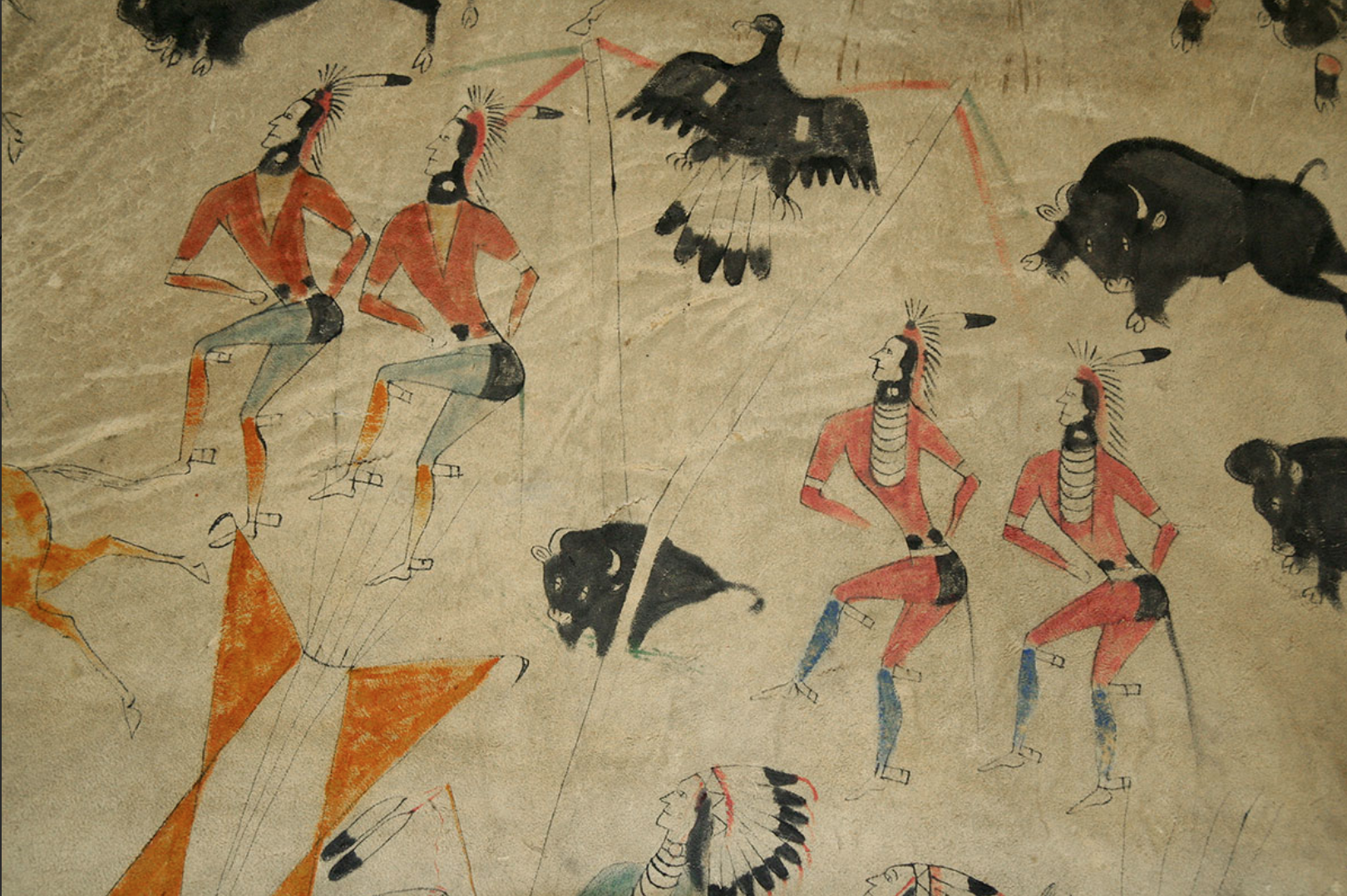
Elk hide painting by Eastern Shoshone artist Cotsiogo.

== Notable Plains hide painters ==
- Kicking Bear, Oglala Lakota
- Naiche, Chiricahua Plains Apache
- Silver Horn, Kiowa
- Tohausen, Kiowa

== See also ==
- Native American art
- Painting in the Americas before Colonization
- American Bison Society
- American bison (Bison bison)
- Bison hunting
- Bison
- Buffalo Commons
- Buffalo Hunters' War
- European bison
- Great bison belt
- Wind Cave Bison Herd
- Wisent
- Wood bison
- Yellowstone Park Bison Herd
