= Red Fish (Oglala) =

Oglala chief and artist

Red Fish was a chief of the Oglala Lakota tribe in the 1840s. He had met with the Jesuit missionary Father Peter John De Smet at Fort Pierre in South Dakota in 1848. He asked for De Smet's help in gaining the return of his daughter who had been kidnapped by the Crow after he had made a disastrous unprovoked raid upon them.

Red Fish was a participant in the Fort Laramie Treaty of 1851, where he represented the Miniconjou with his son Lone Horn (c. 1814-1875). He negotiated with Chief Big Robber of the Crow, who was also a participant in the Fort Laramie Treaty, to establish regional boundaries.
