= Crowheart Butte =

Butte in Wyoming, United States

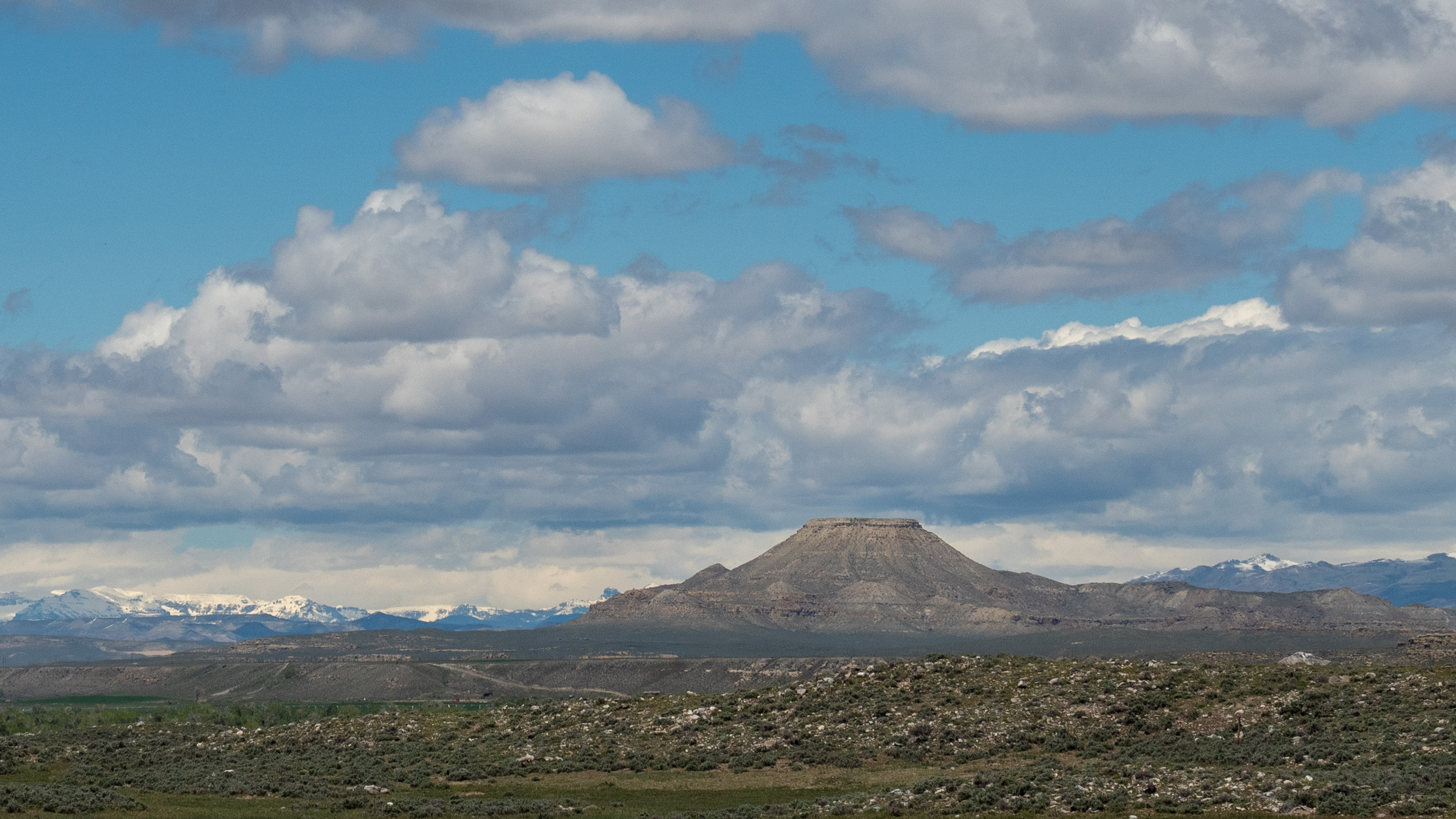
- Crowheart Butte from the southeast, 2022

Highest point
- Elevation: 6,772 ft (2,064 m)
- Prominence: 700 ft (210 m)
- Coordinates: 43°18′37″N 109°05′41″W

Geography
- Location within Wyoming

Crowheart Butte is a summit located in the Wind River Valley in rural Fremont County, Wyoming. The community of Crowheart is located nearby.

Crowheart Butte was named after an 1866 battle between the Shoshone and Crow tribes. According to legend, following a five-day battle for hunting rights in the Wind River Range, Chief Washakie of the Shoshone and Chief Big Robber of the Crow agreed to a duel to decide the winner. Chief Washakie slew his opponent, but impressed with his courage, cut out his heart and placed it on the end of his lance.
