= USS Washakie =

Tugboat of the United States Navy

History

United States
- Name: USS Washakie
- Namesake: Washakie (ca. 1804-1900), a Shoshone chief
- Builder: Ira S. Bushey and Sons, Brooklyn, New York
- Laid down: 13 October 1943
- Launched: 13 February 1944
- Acquired: 30 June 1944
- Commissioned: 1 July 1944
- Recommissioned: May 1953
- Decommissioned: 1946 (first time); Probably 1975 (second and final time)
- Reclassified: From harbor tug, YT-386, to large harbor tug, YTB-386, 15 May 1944; Medium harbor tug, YTM-386, February 1962
- Stricken: 1 May 1975
- Honors and awards: One battle star for World War II service
- Fate: Probably sold after striking date

General characteristics
- Type: Iwana-class large harbor tug
- Displacement: 218 tons
- Length: 100 ft 0 in (30.48 m)
- Beam: 25 ft 0 in (7.62 m)
- Draft: 10 ft 0 in (3.05 m)
- Speed: 11 knots

USS Washakie (YTB-386), laid down as YT-386, later YTM-386, was a United States Navy tug in commission from 1944 to 1946 and from 1953 to probably 1975.

Washakie was laid down on 13 October 1943 at Brooklyn, New York, by Ira S. Bushey and Sons as YT-386. She was launched on 13 February 1944. Reclassified as a large harbor tug and redesignated YTB-386 on 15 May 1944 prior to completion, she was delivered to the U.S. Navy on 30 June 1944 and placed in service on 1 July 1944.

Washakie steamed from New York City, transited the Panama Canal, and served the Service Force, United States Pacific Fleet, for the duration of World War II. During the last year of hostilities with Japan, she served at various forward bases in the Central Pacific but finally ended up at Okinawa. She remained active at Okinawa even after the Japanese capitulation on 15 August 1945. Washakie received one battle star for World War II service.

When Typhoon Louise struck Okinawa in October 1945, Washakie was one of several ships grounded or otherwise damaged by the storm. As a result of that damage, she was placed out of service on 16 October 1945. Soon refloated, she was ordered to Sasebo, Japan. While underway, she ran into another typhoon and was towed to an anchorage near Shanghai, China, for safety. She remained in Chinese waters for another six months before returning to the United States in April 1946. After completing inactivation overhaul, she was placed in reserve with the San Diego Group, Pacific Reserve Fleet, at San Diego, California.

In May 1953, Washakie came out of reserve, retransited the Panama Canal, and reported for duty at Mayport, Florida. There she remained for the next 22 years, serving under the auspices of the Commandant, 6th Naval District. In February 1962, she was reclassified a medium harbor tug and received the new designation YTM-386.

Her name struck from the Navy List on 1 May 1975. Presumably, she was sold sometime thereafter.

Washakie received one battle star for World War II service.
