= Eastern Shoshone =

Native American tribe in Wyoming

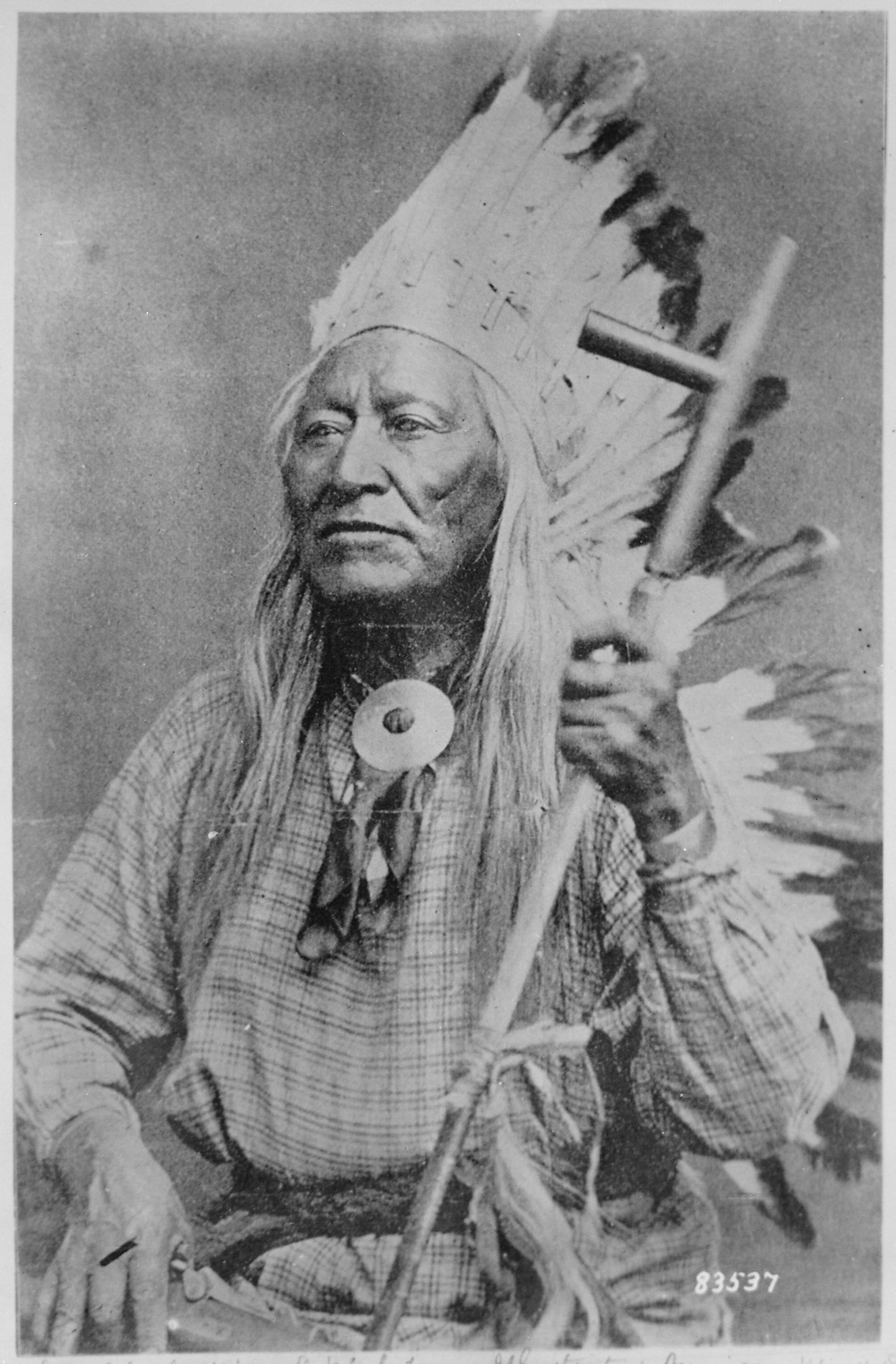
- Washakie, (translated as:Shoots the Buffalo Running), Eastern Shoshone chief

Regions with significant populations
- United States (Wyoming, Utah)

Languages
- Shoshone, English

Religion
- Native American Church, Sun Dance, traditional tribal religion, Christianity, Ghost Dance

Related ethnic groups
- other Shoshone people, Comanche

Map of traditional lands of the Eastern Shoshone

Eastern Shoshone are Shoshone who primarily live in Wyoming and in the northeast corner of the Great Basin where Utah, Idaho and Wyoming meet and are in the Great Basin classification of Indigenous People. They lived in the Rocky Mountains during the 1805 Lewis and Clark Expedition and adopted Plains horse culture in contrast to Western Shoshone that maintained a Great Basin culture.

The Eastern Shoshone primarily settled on the Wind River Indian Reservation in Wyoming, after their leader, Washakie signed the Fort Bridger Treaty in 1868.

== History ==
The Eastern Shoshone adopted horses much sooner than their neighbours to the North, the Blackfoot Confederacy (made up of three related groups, the Piegan, Siksika, and Kainai). With the advantages that horses provided in battle, such as speed and mobility, the Eastern Shoshone were able to expand to the north and soon occupied much of present-day southern and central Alberta, most of Montana, and parts of Wyoming, and raided the Blackfoot frequently. Meanwhile, their close cousins, the Comanche, split off and migrated south to present-day western Texas. Once the Piegan, in particular, had access to horses of their own and guns obtained from the Hudson's Bay Company via the Cree and Assiniboine, the situation changed. By 1787 David Thompson reports that the Blackfoot had completely conquered most of Shoshone territory, and frequently captured Shoshone women and children and forcibly assimilated them into Blackfoot society, further increasing their advantages over the Shoshone. Thompson reports that Blackfoot territory in 1787 was from the North Saskatchewan River in the north to the Missouri River in the South, and from Rocky Mountains in the west out to a distance of 300 miles (480 km) to the east.

Through the early 1800s, the Eastern Shoshone and Crow fought over the contested Wind River Basin, a prime bison hunting area, culminating in an incident at Crow Heart Butte, where Washakie challenged and defeated a leading Crow warrior for possession of the Wind River Valley. The Eastern Shoshone participated significantly in the Rocky Mountain Fur Trade and bison hide trade from the 1820s and 1840s. The rendezvous sites along the Wind River Range were established in areas previously used by the Shoshone for trade fairs. By the 1850s, Washakie had emerged as a leader among the Shoshone, known for his war prowess as well as his ability to negotiate with whites. Fluent in English and a friend and father-in-law of Jim Bridger, Washakie championed the establishment of the Wind River Indian Reservation through negotiations at the 1863 and 1868 treaties at Fort Bridger.

After the reservation period, the Eastern Shoshone saw the arrival of Northern Arapaho on the Wind River Indian Reservation in 1878. Later negotiations reduced the size of the reservation and resulted in settlement of lands within the Wind River Reclamation Project. In 1938 the Eastern Shoshone won the case United States vs. Shoshone Tribe of Indians, securing rights to timber and mineral resources on the reservation reserved to them under the Fort Bridger Treaties. This lawsuit argued by George Tunison ruled that the Shoshone were owed payment for the location of the Northern Arapaho to the Wind River Indian Reservation. In the 1970s, Eastern Shoshone tribal members uncovered that oil field workers on the reservation were stealing oil without paying royalties, a scandal that led to reforms.

== Language ==
Eastern Shoshone speak the Shoshone language, a Central Numic language in the Uto-Aztecan language family. It is spoken on the Wind River Indian Reservation.

== Bands ==
Bands of Shoshone people were named for their geographic homelands and for their primary food sources.

- Kuccuntikka or Kuchun-deka (Guchundeka', Kutsindüka, Buffalo Eaters), living on the eastern edges of the Great Basin along the upper Green River Valley, Big Sandy River and Wind River eastward to the Wind River Basin (Shoshone Basin) and Bighorn Basin of western Wyoming and southwestward to Bear Lake and Great Salt Lake in southeast Idaho and northern Utah, they possessed from all Shoshone bands the greatest horse herds, also called Plains Shoshone, later called Washakie Shoshone or Wind River Shoshone)
- Haivodika or Haiwodekanee (Dove Eaters, so named by their Kuccuntikka kin, because they allegedly behaved timidly on buffalo hunts, also called Blacks Fork Indians. About 1825 they broke off from the main body of Kuccuntikka to live nearer and with white settlements and trading posts. They lived the greater part of the year along the creeks of Green River in the Bridger Basin in western Wyoming and particular at Henrys Fork in southeastern Idaho. They served as go-betweens between the nomadic Eastern and Northern Shoshone bands and Utes, Flathead, Nez Perce, and occasionally Crow Indians and the whites at the trading post Fort Bridger. In this intermediary role, they were middlemen traders who bought skins from the Plains Indians and sold them at the Fort and distributed the white Traders' goods among the Ute and Navajo. It is even known that they went to the Mormons at Great Salt Lake and exchanged skins for agricultural products and textiles. With the end of the Fur Trade and the bison hunting the Haivodika lost their social function and their identity as a separate Eastern Shoshone band. They chose to live with their Mixed-blood relatives in the surrounding white settlements or their Kuccuntikka kin on the Wind River Reservation)
- Tukkutikka (Tukudeka, Dukundeka', Sheep Eaters, Mountain Sheep Eaters, living in the Wind River Range in western Wyoming, Salmon River, Salmon River Mountains, in the Sawtooth Valley surrounded by the Sawtooth Range, upper Payette River, in the Bitterroot Mountains and Beaverhead Mountains, Idaho and north toward the upper Beaverhead drainage and the upper Yellowstone River in northern Wyoming and southern Montana, also known as Doyahinee' (Mountain People) or Banaiti Doyanee (Bannock Mountaineers), because of great intermarriage with Bannock, only the Tukkutikka bands living in the Yellowstone River region settled with the main body of Eastern Shoshone onto the Wind River Reservation, the majority joined as part of the Lemhi Shoshone the Northern Shoshone
- Boho'inee, (Pohoko’ikkatee, Pohogwe, Pohoini, Sage Grass people, Sagebrush Butte People), mixed Shoshone-Bannock band, living in southeastern Idaho on the Snake River Plain, in the Wind River Range, Salmon Falls on Snake River and wintered in the vicinity of the trading post Fort Hall, but also claimed the Camas Prairie as home, later called Fort Hall Shoshone or "Sho-Bans"

== Contemporary tribes and communities ==
- Northwestern Band of Shoshoni Nation of Utah (Washakie)
- Shoshone Tribe of the Wind River Reservation, Wyoming

- Fort Washakie, Wyoming
- Wind River, Wyoming
- Crowheart, Wyoming

== Notable Eastern Shoshone ==
- Cotsiogo (c. 1866–1912), artist
- Washakie (c. 1798–1900), war leader and diplomat
- Eva McAdams (1927–2010), regalia maker

== See also ==
- Fort Bridger Treaty Council of 1868
- United States v. Shoshone Tribe of Indians
