= John Roberts (missionary) =

Welsh Anglican missionary

Rev. John Roberts
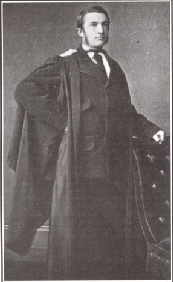
- John Roberts 1874, Bahamas
- Born: 31 March 1853; Dyserth, Wales
- Died: 22 January 1949 (aged 95); Wyoming
- Church: Anglican
- Title: Priest

John Roberts (31 March 1853 – 22 January 1949) was a Welsh Anglican priest, writer and missionary in the Bahamas and Wyoming.

Roberts was born in 1853 at Llewerllyd, a farm near the village of Dyserth, which was then in Flintshire but was later placed in Denbighshire, in north Wales. Educated at Ruthin grammar school and St David's College, Lampeter (then affiliated with Oxford University), Roberts graduated in 1878. He was ordained a deacon by the Right Rev. George Augustus Selwyn in Lichfield Cathedral, and briefly served as a curate at Dawley Magna in Shropshire. However, Roberts yearned to become a missionary, possibly because of Selwyn's work in New Zealand. By year's end, Roberts had sailed to Nassau, Bahamas, where he was ordained a priest and made chaplain of St. Matthew's Anglican Church. Roberts concentrated his ministry among "coloured people" and lepers. However, those were already Christian, and the priest wanted greater challenges, particularly among American Indians.

Two years later, Roberts sailed to New York and applied for the mission he always wanted, among American Indians. He met Bishop John Spalding of Wyoming and Colorado, and asked for missionary work in the diocese's most difficult field. He was told that was at the Shoshone and Bannock Indian Agency in Wyoming Territory (in what later became the Wind River Indian Reservation). However, Bishop Spalding wanted the young priest to first gain experience, and so sent him first to tend to the spiritual needs of coal miners in Greeley, Colorado, and then to the mixed community in Pueblo. There, Roberts established Trinity mission in South Pueblo. When a smallpox epidemic caused the community to be quarantined, Roberts worked at the hospital.

With that experience, Roberts secured his dream job in 1883, ministering to the Shoshone and Arapahoe tribes and other people within 150 miles of Fort Washakie. Roberts was also a government employee, serving as the first principal of the reservation's school. Roberts became known for his interest in, and support for, traditional customs. Roberts also translated the Bible into the local languages.

The boarding school for girls that Chief Washakie and Roberts established in 1888 was placed on the National Register of Historic Places, though it has not operated as a school since 1949. Roberts also established several churches in his territory, many of which still function.

Wyoming's flag was presented to be flown in Washington National Cathedral in his honor.

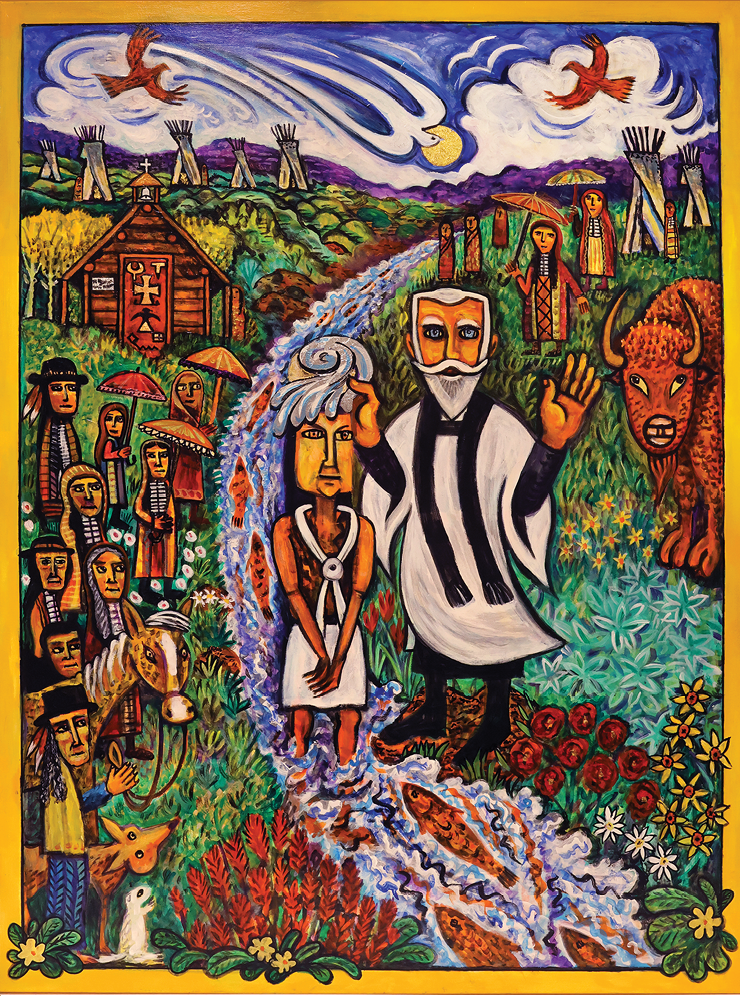
“Servant of God” by Brian Whelan, one of thirteen paintings on the life of Rev. Dr. John Roberts, 2022/2023
