= Crowheart, Wyoming =

Census-designated place in Fremont County, Wyoming, United States

- Census-designated place
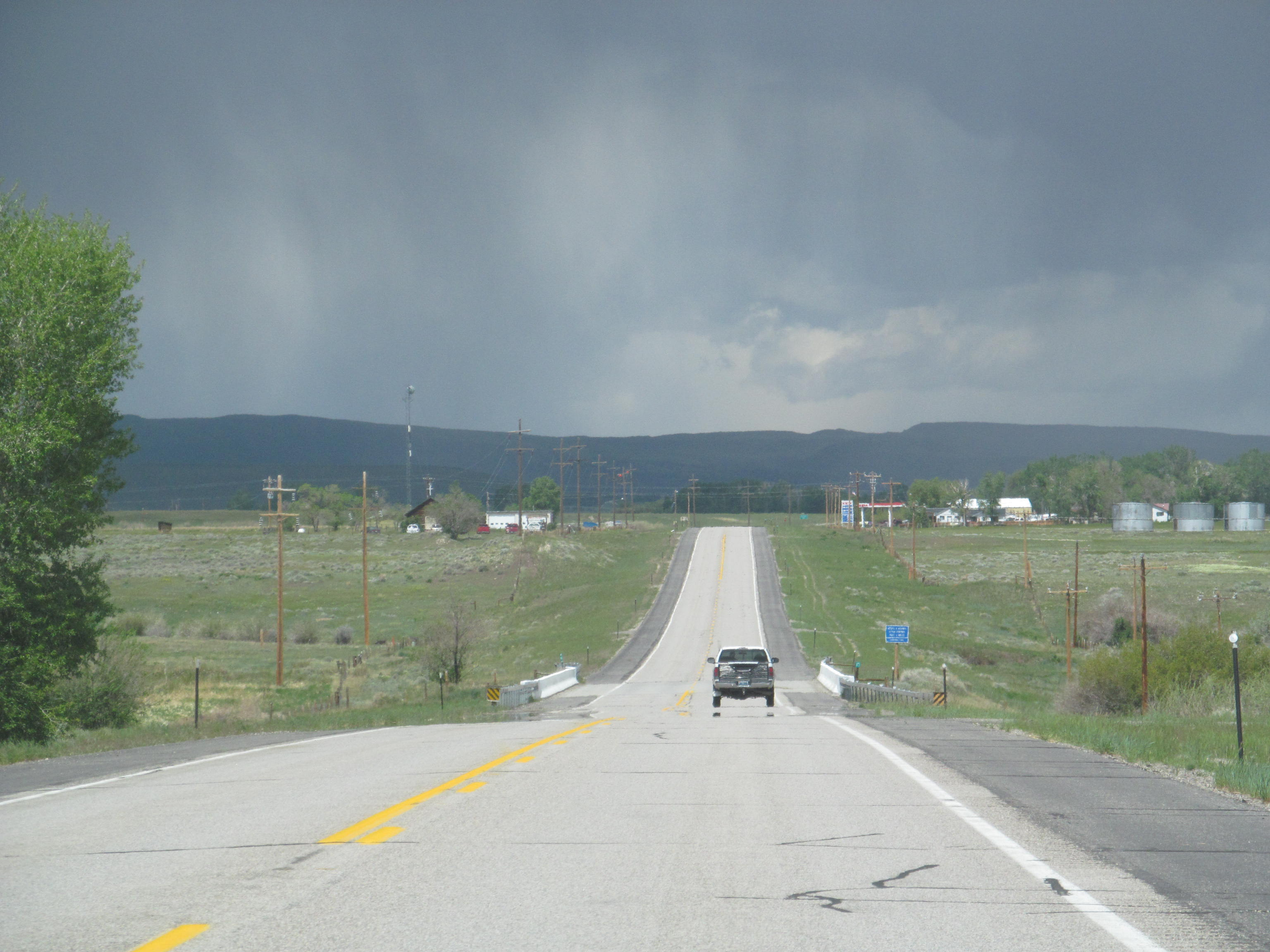
- West along Route 26/Route 287 toward the central part of Crowheat, June 2014

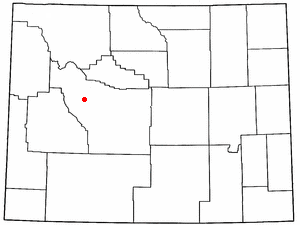
- Location of Crowheart, Wyoming
- Coordinates: 43°21′20″N 109°14′19″W
- Country: United States
- State: Wyoming
- County: Fremont

Area
  - Total: 31.5 sq mi (81.5 km^{2})
  - Land: 31.5 sq mi (81.5 km^{2})
  - Water: 0 sq mi (0.0 km^{2})
- Elevation: 6,096 ft (1,858 m)

Population (2020)
  - Total: 120
  - Density: 3.8/sq mi (1.5/km^{2})
- Time zone: UTC-7 (Mountain (MST))
  - Summer (DST): UTC-6 (MDT)
- ZIP code: 82512
- Area code: 307
- FIPS code: 56-18225
- GNIS feature ID: 2407688

Crowheart is a census-designated place (CDP) in Fremont County, Wyoming, United States. The population was 120 at the 2020 census.

== Notable people ==
- Matthew Fox — Plays Jack Shephard in Lost and was also a main character in Party of Five.

== See also ==
- List of census-designated places in Wyoming
