= Fort Washakie, Wyoming =

Fort Washakie, Wyoming Ce'eyeino'oowu' (Arapaho)
- Census-designated place
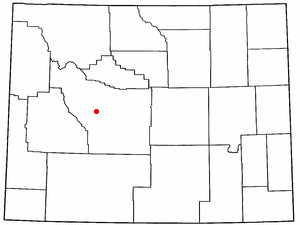
- Location of Fort Washakie, Wyoming
- Coordinates: 42°00′14″N 108°55′05″W
- Country: United States
- State: Wyoming
- County: Fremont

Area
  - Total: 20.9 sq mi (54.2 km^{2})
  - Land: 20.9 sq mi (54.2 km^{2})
  - Water: 0 sq mi (0.0 km^{2})
- Elevation: 5,571 ft (1,698 m)

Population (2010)
  - Total: 1,759
  - Density: 84.1/sq mi (32.5/km^{2})
- Time zone: UTC-7 (Mountain (MST))
  - Summer (DST): UTC-6 (MDT)
- ZIP code: 82514
- Area code: 307
- FIPS code: 56-28665
- GNIS feature ID: 2408245

Fort Washakie (Arapaho: Ce'eyeino'oowu') is a census-designated place (CDP) in Fremont County, Wyoming, United States, within the Wind River Indian Reservation and along U.S. Route 287. The population was 1,759 at the 2010 census. The headquarters for the Eastern Shoshone Tribe is located in Fort Washakie, as well as the Bureau of Indian Affairs agency for the Wind River Indian Reservation.

Fort Washakie is named after nearby Fort Washakie, a U.S. Army post established in 1869 and named after Chief Washakie in 1878. Washakie, Utah is also named for Washakie.

== Geography ==
It is in the foothills of the Wind River Range and just east of the Continental Divide.

According to the United States Census Bureau, the CDP has a total area of 20.9 square miles (54.2 km^{2}), all land.

== Demographics ==
As of the census of 2000, there were 1,477 people, 432 households, and 333 families residing in the CDP. The population density was 70.6 people per square mile (27.3/km^{2}). There were 493 housing units at an average density of 23.6/sq mi (9.1/km^{2}). The racial makeup of the CDP was 92.62% Native American (mostly Eastern Shoshone), 5.89% White, 0.07% African American, 0.68% from other races, and 0.74% from two or more races. Hispanic or Latino of any race were 3.25% of the population.

There were 432 households, out of which 45.4% had children under the age of 18 living with them, 39.6% were married couples living together, 29.4% had a female householder with no husband present, and 22.7% were non-families. 19.2% of all households were made up of individuals, and 5.3% had someone living alone who was 65 years of age or older. The average household size was 3.29 and the average family size was 3.75.

In the CDP, the population was spread out, with 37.2% under the age of 18, 9.1% from 18 to 24, 28.7% from 25 to 44, 16.1% from 45 to 64, and 8.8% who were 65 years of age or older. The median age was 27 years. For every 100 females, there were 101.5 males. For every 100 females age 18 and over, there were 96.0 males.

The median income for a household in the CDP was $18,906, and the median income for a family was $20,658. Males had a median income of $23,295 versus $22,885 for females. The per capita income for the CDP was $7,700. About 42.9% of families and 42.7% of the population were below the poverty line, including 45.8% of those under age 18 and 52.0% of those age 65 or over.

== Education ==
Public education in the community of Fort Washakie is provided by Fremont County School District #21.

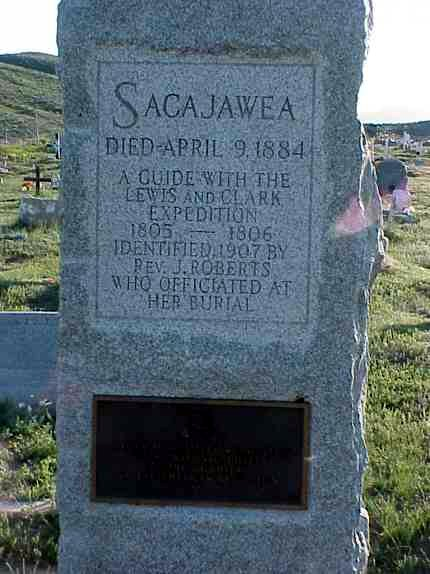
Tombstone for Sacajawea

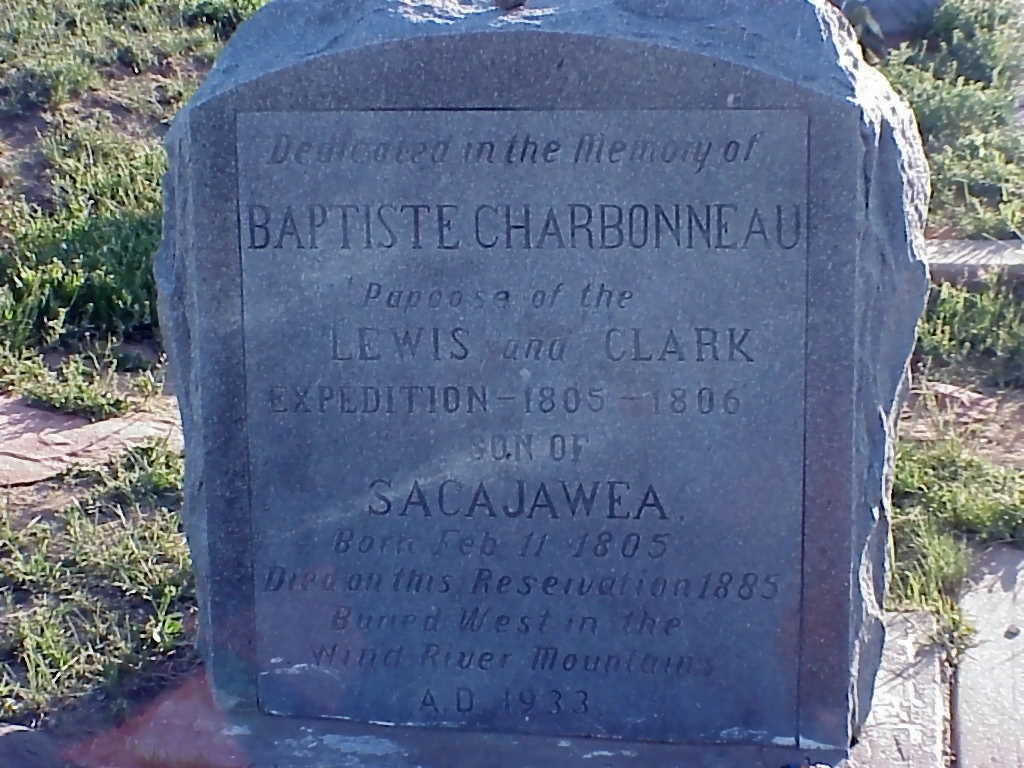
Memorial to Baptiste Charbonneau, son of Sacajawea

== Points of interest ==
- There is a memorial to Sacagawea's son Jean Baptiste Charbonneau. His grave site is in Danner, Oregon.
- The Wyoming e Academy of Virtual Education (WeAVE) online high school operates out of Fort Washakie.
- A grave purported to be Sacagawea's is located in the local cemetery just north of town
- The Chief Washakie Cemetery is located in Fort Washakie
- The Eastern Shoshone powwow grounds located in Fort Washakie hosts one of Wyoming's largest three-day powwow each June.
- Rocky Mountain Hall, a large gymnasium and tribal building, is home to the Buffalo Room, which has exhibit cases on Eastern Shoshone history and veterans.
- The Eastern Shoshone Cultural Center located inside Fort Washakie School features history exhibits and artifacts, as well as the school library which has a resources for historical researchers
- Numerous Shoshone Tribal offices are located in Fort Washakie
- The site of the Shoshone Episcopal Mission, former Mission School, and Rev. John Roberts residence are located southwest of town. The school building burned in 2016.
