= Buffalo Treaty =

Indigenous treaty about buffalo

First Yellowstone bison to be released from the transportation trailer during a reintroduction at Ft. Peck Indian Reservation.

The Buffalo Treaty is a living treaty among Indian tribes and First Nations to return and expand Buffalo populations to their historic range and regenerate cultural, social, political and spiritual relations with the buffalo. It has been signed by over 40 native tribes. It is the first cross-border treaty among tribes in over a century.

== Background ==
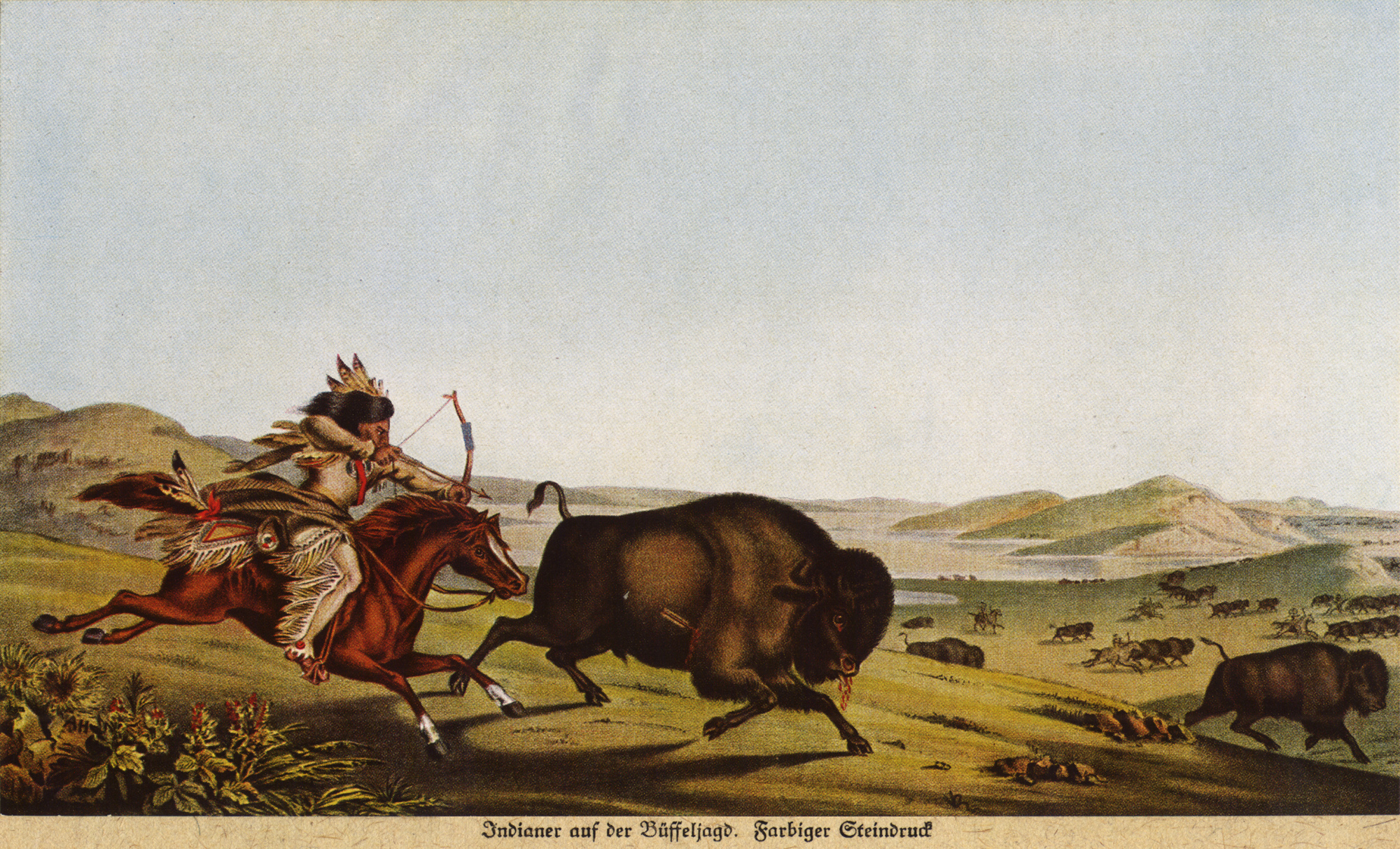
Drawing of a Native American hunting buffalo.

Buffalo are a keystone species that provide many ecological services that the treaty seeks to restore. Buffalo wallow in the soil, making holes that turn into small ponds. These holes and ponds are used by pronghorn, rattlesnakes, flies, ants, birds (such as magpies), amphibians (such as boreal toads) and native grass species. Their dense fur and their large size allow seeds to get trapped in their coat. They move to other locations and rub themselves against plants or the ground, dispersing the seeds and helping plants spread. Grazing buffalo eat young trees and shrubs (stopping them from growing to adulthood and crowding out grasses) while stimulating the growth of local prairie grasses. This allows the unique prairie ecosystem to continue and prevents soil compaction. Their excrement fertilizes the soil, introducing nitrogen, phosphorus and potassium. These prairie soils are carbon-dense, making them an important carbon sink.

Buffalo adults and their calves on the prairie alongside with scattered small trees.

Buffalo lived continuously across the interior Great Plains of North America, and they became highly important to the Native peoples they live alongside, who consider them people and relatives. Native Americans use buffalo for food, tools, and clothing. Over time, buffalo migration paths became trails for Native peoples as they followed buffalo across their migration routes. Many Indigenous songs, stories and ceremonies relate to Buffalo. Buffalo hold a central role in Indigenous gift economies. Maintaining access to buffalo led to conflicts betweens tribes on the plains such as those between the Iron and Blackfoot Confederacies. Peace treaties between tribes often created shared hunting grounds.

During the colonization of the Great Plains, the United States encouraged buffalo hunting (Note: In 'Awakening Buffalo Consciousness: Lessons, Theory, and Practice from the Buffalo Treaty,' the hunting is described as a genocide.) to starve and genocide native tribes in the region who depend on buffalo for their livelihoods. Settlers were also seeking to clear lands to be safe for agricultural and economic development alongside both commercial fur hunting and recreational hunting. By 1900, there were only 500 buffalo alive. Although populations of buffalo are now in the hundreds of thousands, the vast majority of them are farm animals on private lands. Only 10,000 wood buffalo and 2,200 plains buffalo live in the wild. Meanwhile, 150,000 live on Canadian farms alone. In modern times, tribes have been working to establish herds in their homelands, efforts which culminated in the Buffalo Treaty.

== Overview ==
A picture of Pueblo buffalo dancers.

The treaty serves as a way for tribes to collaborate to restore wild buffalo and wild grass populations while rematriating their Indigenous cultures, relationships, religions and food sovereignty to maintain the narrow range of conditions humans need for survival. An important aspect of cultural revitalization is reestablishing relationship with buffalo, including through buffalo hunting. Nongovernmental organizations are allowed to sign to be supporters when their goals generally align with the buffalo and the treaty, even if specific ideas for implementation differ. Likewise, individual tribes are empowered to pursue their own projects in connection with their unique local context and culture. The treaty serves as a way for NGOs to share expertise with each other NGOs and with tribes.

A Native American buffalo hide painting likely made in the Northern Missouri River area in the early 19th century.

The Buffalo Treaty raises what Blackfoot professor Leroy Little Bear considers buffalo consciousness. An appreciation of the role of buffalo in relation to other creatures and the cultural and ecological services they provide. It arises from exposure to buffalo in daily life, which activates Indigenous songs, stories, ceremonies and governance surrounding buffalo through regular exposure. It also brings the tribes together in relationship because of a common concern for buffalo while including each tribes unique culture and connection to buffalo.

One project under the treaty is the effort to build continuous open corridors between buffalo herds, such as one from Wind Cave National Park to the Missouri River for buffalo to roam freely and graze. It is also argued that the tribes having a unified political front will make pushing larger changes easier. Indigenous tribes have also been pursuing ranching of buffalo to feed tribal citizens and build community. Blood Tribe elders reported seeing locally extirpated birds for the first time after the reestablishment of a buffalo population.

The importance of relationships between plains tribes and buffalo led to both conflict and kinship alliances between various tribes. The Buffalo treaty uses regular interaction and relationships to strengthen preexisting buffalo-related kinship while healing old conflicts. It also builds new relationships and kinship bonds between tribes that didn't previously have relationships with each other.

== History ==
Starting in 2009, intertribal discussions called buffalo dialogues were held to explore possible ways to return buffalo to tribal lands, initiated by member tribes of the Blackfoot Confederacy. The first discussion in 2009 was held by Blood Tribe elders to teach their youth about buffalo. Blackfoot knowledge holders felt that their reciprocal relationship with the buffalo had been abandoned due to entrenched settler colonialism and materialism. This led to buffalo knowledge being passed down less often to youth. Eventually, Blackfoot elders decided non-Blackfoot allies would be needed and they reached out initially to other tribes who already had buffalo herds, such as the Confederated Salish Kootenai tribe, alongside the tribes on Fort Belknap and Fort Peck reservations. The treaty was originally signed on September 23, 2014, on Blackfeet Nation land by 8 tribes governing more than six million acres and it has expanded through annual signing ceremonies since. Leroy Little Bear, named treaty emissary, has played a key role in the treaty process and in buffalo dialogues. Amethyst First Rider and Paulette Fox have also been prominent figures in the treaty process.

During the bison conservation transfer facility expansion President Ervin Carlson of the InterTribal Buffalo Council recognizes the organization's team.

In February 2017, elders from various Treaty 7 tribes conducted a ceremony in Elk Island National Park for the transport of 33 buffalo to Panther Valley of Banff National Park, where another ceremony was held on their arrival. Later in July 2018, the buffalo were released from a small 16-hectare temporary pasture into a 12,000-acre pasture and another ceremony was held. The other Buffalo Treaty tribes helped pressure Parks Canada to follow through with the reintroduction.

In October 2026, a signing ceremony for the anniversary of the treaty was held in the Black Hills and hosted by the Oglala Sioux Tribe.

== Signatories ==
This list only reliably includes signatories up to September 25, 2024. Non-governmental organizations can also be signatories under Article VIII of the treaty but are not listed exhaustively.

=== Original signatories ===
- Assiniboine and Sioux Tribes of the Fort Peck Indian Reservation
- Blackfeet Nation
- Blood Tribe
- Confederated Salish and Kootenai Tribes of the Flathead Reservation
- Fort Belknap Indian Community
- Piikani Nation
- Siksika Nation
- Tsuutʼina Nation

=== Later signatories ===
Shaggy buffalo grazing in the Lakota Tribal Park, an large section of grasslands on the eastern side of the Cheyenne River Indian Reservation.

- Ahtahakakoop Cree Nation (August 17, 2022)
- Alexis First Nation (October 22, 2026)
- Athabasca Chipewyan First Nation (September 25, 2024)
- Cheyenne River Sioux Tribe (October 22, 2026)
- Chiniki First Nation (September 23, 2015)
- Cold Lake First Nation (September 25, 2024)
- Cote First Nation (September 25, 2024)
- Cowessess First Nation (August 15, 2023)
- Crow Creek Sioux Tribe (October 22, 2026)
- Driftpile Cree Nation (October 22, 2026)
- Eastern Shoshone Tribes (October 6, 2019)
- Enoch Cree First Nation (September 25, 2022)
- Ermineskin First Nation (September 20, 2019)
- Flandreau Santee Sioux Tribe (October 22, 2026)
- Frog Lake First Nation (September 20, 2019)
- Goodstoney First Nation (September 23, 2015)
- Heiltsuk Nation (September 25, 2024)
- Kehewin Cree Nation (October 22, 2026)
- Ktunaxa Nation (May 22, 2018)
- Leech Lake Band of Ojibwe (October 22, 2026)
- Louis Bull Tribe (May 22, 2018)
- Lower Brule Sioux Tribe (October 22, 2026)
- Ministikwan Lake First Nation (September 25, 2024)
- Mistawasis Nêhiyawak (May 22, 2018)
- Montana First Nation (September 20, 2019)
- Moosomin First Nation (August 17, 2022)
- Mosquito, Grizzly Bear's Head, Lean Man First Nations (August 17, 2022)
- Nekaneet First Nation (July 15, 2022)
- Ngāti Tūwharetoa (September 25, 2024)
- Northern Arapaho Tribe (June 2, 2022)
- Ocean Man First Nation (September 29, 2016)
- Ochapowace First Nation (September 29, 2016)
- Oglala Sioux Tribe (October 6, 2019)
- Okanese First Nation (September 29, 2016)
- Paul First Nation (September 25, 2024)
- Pheasant Rump Nakota Nation (September 29, 2016)
- Pigeon Lake Cree Nation (September 20, 2019)
- Red Pheasant Cree Nation (August 17, 2022)
- Sakimay First Nation (September 29, 2016)
- Saulteaux First Nation (August 17, 2022)
- Samson Cree Nation (September 23, 2015)
- Sapotaweyak Nation (September 29, 2016)
- Secwepemc Nation (May 22, 2018)
- Sicangu Oyate (October 22, 2026)
- Smith's Landing First Nation (September 25, 2024)
- Standing Rock Sioux Tribe (October 22, 2026)
- Star Blanket Cree Nation (September 29, 2016)
- Stoney Knoll Band (August 17, 2022)
- Sturgeon Lake Cree Nation (October 22, 2026)
- Sweetgrass First Nation (August 17, 2022)
- Tobacco Plains Band (September 25, 2024)
- Waterhen Lake First Nation (August 17, 2022)
- White Bear First Nations (October 22, 2026)
- Woodland Cree First Nation (September 20, 2019)
- Wuskwi Sipihk First Nation (September 29, 2016)
- Yankton Sioux Tribe (October 22, 2026)

==== Organization signatories ====
- Aaniiih Nakoda College (November 6, 2023)
- InterTribal Buffalo Council (October 31, 2019)
- Lethbridge (March 8, 2023)
- Lipan Apache Band of Texas (June 2, 2022)
- Mount Royal University (September 25, 2024)
- NDN Collective (October 22, 2026)
- Sinte Gleska University (October 22, 2026)
- University of Lethbridge (March 8, 2023)

== See also ==
- American bison hunting
  - Buffalo pound
  - Buffalo rifle
  - Game drive system
  - Métis buffalo hunting
- American Bison Society
- Beefalo
- Buffalo coat
- Buffalo Commons
- Buffalo dance
- Buffalo robe
- Bull boat
- Canadian bison conservation
- Conservation of American bison
- Dish With One Spoon
- Great Race
- List of bison conservation herds
- National Bison Day
- Pânsâwân
- Plains hide painting
- Tunnel Mountain
- Vincennes Trace
- White buffalo
- White Buffalo Calf Woman
- White Buffalo Cow Society
- Wi
