= Native Science =

2001 book by Gregory Cajete

- Author: Gregory Cajete
- Language: English
- Subject: Traditional ecological knowledge
- Genre: Non-fiction
- Published: 2001
- Publisher: Clear Light Publishing
- ISBN: 9781574160413

Native Science: Natural Laws of Interdependence is a 2001 book about traditional ecological knowledge by Gregory Cajete.

== Publication ==
Native Science was first published by Clear Light Publishing in 2001 and had 328 pages.

A second edition 352-page edition was published in 2016 with a foreword by Leroy Little Bear.

== Synopsis ==
In Native Science, Cajete describes how Indigenous peoples of the Americas have "a lived and creative relationship with the natural world" and a heightened "awareness of the subtle qualities of a place." The book notes how the scientific community has benefited from the traditional ecological knowledge of Indigenous peoples. Cajete describes science as inclusive of spirituality and relationships between species. The book covers topics including crop cultivation, astronomy, Indigenous ceremony, and health.

== Critical reception ==
The book is used Leech Lake Tribal College's class Anishinaabe Understanding of Ecology.
