= National Bison Legacy Act =

United States Law

An American bison galloping

The National Bison Legacy Act (H.R. 2908) was signed and enacted into United States law on May 9, 2016, by President Barack Obama. The act designated the bison as the official national mammal. In support of the act, the findings of the U.S. Congress declared that bison (buffalo) are a national historical symbol integrated with the spiritual and economic lifeways of several Indigenous peoples, and more than 60 tribes of the United States.

The American bison along with the American bald eagle has been designated as national animals that are symbols of America; the bison designation as a national mammal was supported by the InterTribal Buffalo Council and National Bison Association after the species' resurgence following near extinction.

== See also ==
- National Bison Day
- Conservation of American bison
