= Gregory Cajete =

Tewa author

Gregory A. Cajete is a Tewa author and professor from Santa Clara Pueblo, New Mexico. He has pioneered reconciling indigenous perspectives in sciences with a Western academic setting. His focus is teaching "culturally based science, with its emphasis on health and wellness."

== Education ==
Cajete earned a Bachelor of Arts degree in biology and sociology from New Mexico Highlands University, with a minor in secondary education. His Masters of Arts degree is from the University of New Mexico, and his doctorate is from the International College, Los Angeles's New Philosophy Program. His doctorate of philosophy is in social science Education with an emphasis in Native American Studies.

== Career ==
Currently he is director of the Native American Studies program and associate professor of education at the University of New Mexico in Albuquerque. He has been a New Mexico Humanities scholar of ethnobotany and is a member of the New Mexico Arts Commission.

For 21 years, he taught at the Institute of American Indian Arts in Santa Fe.

== Fellowships and honors ==
Cajete served as principal investigator for several prominent studies of native science and education, that were funded by the National Science Foundation, New Mexico Endowment for the Humanities, and the U.S. Department of Agriculture. The Newberry Library’s D’Arcy McNickle Center, the U.S. Department of Education, and the School for Advanced Research has awarded him with fellowships. He also volunteered for many services that helped small communities in small towns around Santa Clara Pueblo.

== Published works ==
- Green, Rayne, Dr. Gregory A. Cajete, and Lucy R. Lippard. Native Views. Influences of Modern Culture. A Contemporary Native American Art Exhibition. Artrain USA: 2004. ASIN B001VAG28W.
- Cajete, Gregory. Indigenous Community: Rekindling the Teachings of the Seventh Fire. Living Justice Press, 2015. ISBN 978-1-937141-18-9.
- Cajete, Gregory and Leroy Little Bear. Native Science: Natural Laws of Interdependence. Clear Light Books, 2001. ISBN 1-57416-041-9.
- Cajete, Gregory. A People's Ecology: Explorations in Sustainable Living. Clear Light Books, 1999. ISBN 1-57416-028-1.
- Cajete, Gregory. Igniting the Sparkle: An Indigenous Science Education Model. Kivaki Press, 1999. ISBN 1-882308-66-2.
- Cajete, Gregory. Look to the Mountain: An Ecology of Indigenous Education. Kivaki Press, 1994. ISBN 978-1-882308-65-1.
