= InterTribal Buffalo Council =

- Formation: 1992
- Headquarters: Rapid City, South Dakota, U.S.
- President: Ervin Carlson
- Website: itbcbuffalonation.org

The Intertribal Buffalo Council (ITBC), also known as the Intertribal Bison Cooperative, is a collection of 82 federally recognized tribes from 20 different states whose mission is to restore buffalo to Indian Country in order to preserve the historical, cultural, traditional, and spiritual relationships for future Native American generations.

Surplus bison from places such as Badlands National Park in South Dakota, Yellowstone National Park in Wyoming, and Grand Canyon National Park in Arizona are relocated to member tribes. Collectively, the ITBC manages over 20,000 bison on over 1,000,000 acres of tribal lands.

== History ==
In February 1991, in the Black Hills of South Dakota, the Native American Fish and Wildlife Society hosted nineteen tribes to discuss ways to reestablish healthy buffalo populations on tribal lands. They decided to form an organization to assist tribes with buffalo programs. That June, Congress appropriated funding for tribal buffalo programs. Tribal representatives met in December to discuss how these appropriations would be spent.

In April 1992 tribal representatives gathered in Albuquerque, NM and officially formed the InterTribal Bison Cooperative (ITBC). Officers were elected and began developing their criteria for membership, articles of incorporation, and by-laws. In September 1992, ITBC was incorporated in the state of Colorado and that summer ITBC was headquartered in Rapid City, South Dakota.

In 2010 it was reorganized from a nonprofit to a federally chartered Indian Organization under Section 17 of the Indian Reorganization Act as the InterTribal Buffalo Council.

On September 25, 2014, in Browning, MT, eight tribes, including four ITBC member tribes, from the US and Canada signed the Buffalo Treaty committing to returning the buffalo to their lands and into their lives.

On May 9, 2016, US Congress signed into law the National Bison Legacy Act, establishing the American bison as the national mammal. The ITBC was part of a coalition that helped pass the law.

The ITBC is working to pass the Indian Buffalo Management Act, which would establish a permanent program within the Department of the Interior to develop and promote tribal ownership and management of buffalo and buffalo habitat on Indian lands. In 2024 the act was passed by the senate and after reintroduction the act advanced unanimously through the House Natural Resources Committee in September 2026.

Since its formation, the ITBC has grown from 19 member tribes to 82 and continues to grow.

== Members ==
As of December 2021, its members included:

1. Alutiiq Tribe of Old Harbor
2. Blackfeet Nation
3. Cherokee Nation
4. Cheyenne and Arapaho Tribes
5. Cheyenne River Sioux Tribe
6. Chippewa Cree Tribe of the Rocky Boy Reservation
7. Confederated Salish & Kootenai Tribes of the Flathead Nation
8. Confederated Tribes of Umatilla
9. Crow Creek Sioux Tribe
10. Crow Tribe of Indians
11. Eastern Shoshone Tribe
12. Flandreau Santee Sioux Tribe
13. Forest County Potawatomi
14. Fort Belknap Indian Community
15. Fort Peck Assiniboine & Sioux Tribes
16. Ho-Chunk Nation
17. Iowa Tribe of Oklahoma
18. Jicarilla Apache Nation
19. Kalispel Tribe of Indians
20. Leech Lake Band of Ojibwe
21. Lower Brule Sioux Tribe
22. Mesa Grande Band of Mission Indians
23. Meskwaki Nation (Sac & Fox Tribe of MS in IA)
24. MHA Nation (Three Affiliated Tribes)
25. Modoc Nation
26. Nambé O-Ween-Gé
27. Native Village of Ruby
28. Northern Arapaho Tribe
29. Northern Cheyenne Tribe
30. Oglala Sioux Tribe
31. Ohkay Owingeh/San Juan Pueblo
32. Omaha Tribe of Nebraska
33. Oneida Nation
34. Osage Nation
35. Picuris Pueblo
36. Pit River Tribe
37. Ponca Tribe of Nebraska
38. Prairie Band Potawatomi Nation
39. Prairie Island Community
40. Pueblo de Cochiti
41. Pueblo of Pojaque
42. Pueblo of Sandia
43. Pueblo of Tesuque
44. Quapaw Tribe of Oklahoma
45. Red Lake Nation Band of Chippewa
46. Rosebud Sioux Tribe
47. Round Valley Indian Tribes
48. Sac & Fox Nation of Missouri in Kansas and Nebraska
49. Salt River Pima-Maricopa Indian Community
50. Santee Sioux Tribe of Nebraska
51. Seminole Nation of Oklahoma
52. Seneca-Cayuga Nation
53. Shakopee Mdewakanton Sioux Community
54. Shoshone Bannock Tribes
55. Sisseton Wahpeton Oyate
56. Skull Valley of Goshutes
57. Southern Ute Tribe
58. Spirit Lake Nation
59. Standing Rock Sioux Tribe
60. Stevens Village
61. Stillaguamish Tribe of Indians
62. Taos Pueblo
63. Tonkawa Tribe
64. Turtle Mountain Band of Chippewa
65. Ute Indian Tribe
66. White Earth Nation
67. Winnebago Tribe of Nebraska
68. Yakama Nation
69. Yankton Sioux Tribe
