= Wind River Tribal College =

Tribal college in Fort Washakie, Wyoming, U.S.

Coordinates: 42.9642°N 108.7155°W

- Motto: Honouring the past - Preparing for the future
- Type: Public tribal and community college
- Established: 1997; 29 years ago
- President: Marlin Spoonhunter
- Location: Ethete, Wyoming, United States
- Campus: Rural reserve
- Website: www.windrivertc.org

Wind River Tribal College, (WRTC) is a tribally chartered college located in Fort Washakie, Wyoming, United States. The campus is on the Wind River Indian Reservation in central Wyoming. WRTC serves residents of the Wind River Indian Reservation and surrounding communities. WRTC's enrollment consists of mostly Northern Arapaho and Eastern Shoshone students.

== History ==
WRTC was chartered by the Northern Arapaho Business Council in September 1997.

== Partnerships ==
WRTC has articulation agreements with the University of Wyoming and the University of Wisconsin-Oshkosh.

WRTC is a member of the American Indian Higher Education Consortium (AIHEC), which is a community of tribally and federally chartered institutions working to strengthen tribal nations and make a lasting difference in the lives of American Indians and Alaska Natives. WRTC was created in response to the higher education needs of American Indians. WRTC generally serves geographically isolated populations that have no other means accessing education beyond the high school level. In 2013, WRTC graduated 10 students with their Bachelor of Arts degree in elementary education. The cohort was the first graduates of the partnership between Wind River and Oshkosh.

== Programs ==
WRTC offers associate degree programs in:

- social work,
- business administration,
- elementary education, and
- criminal justice.

In Summer 2015, the college hosted an Arapaho language camp.
