= Wind River Indian Reservation =

Indian reservation in Wyoming, United States

- Indian reservation
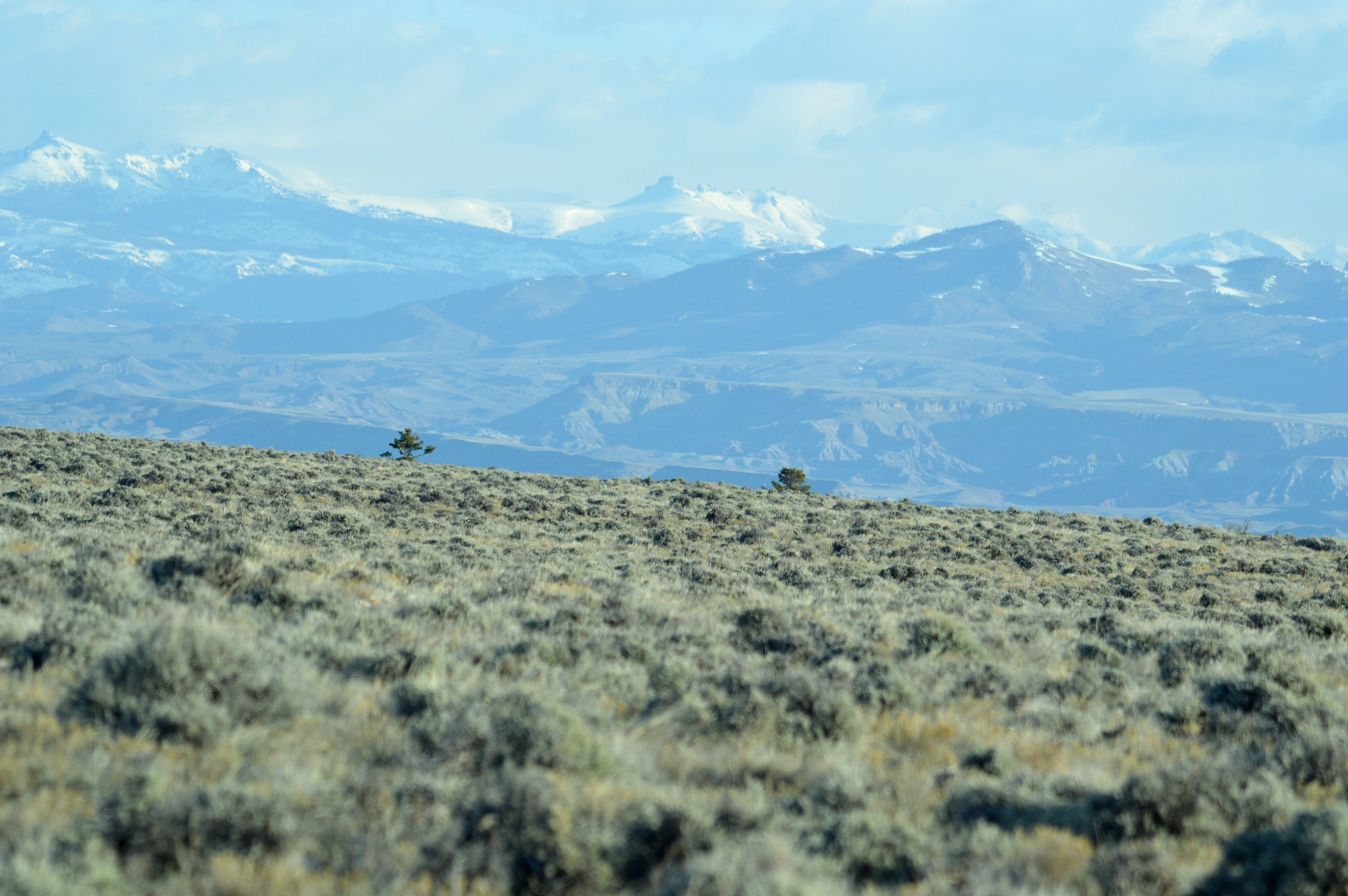
- Wind River Range

- Flag Arapaho Flag

- Location in Wyoming
- Federally Recognized Native American Tribes: Eastern Shoshone; Northern Arapaho
- Country: United States
- State: Wyoming
- Counties: Fremont; Hot Springs
- Headquarters: Fort Washakie

Government
  - Body: Business Councils
  - Chairman: Wayland Large (Eastern Shoshone); Keenan Groesbeck (Northern Arapaho)
  - Co-Chairman / Co-Chairwoman: Stanford Ware (Eastern Shoshone); Kimberly Whiteman Harjo (Northern Arapaho)

Area
  - Total: 3,532.010 sq mi (9,147.86 km^{2})
  - Land: 3,473.272 sq mi (8,995.73 km^{2})

Population (2017)
  - Total: 27,088
  - Density: 7.7990/sq mi (3.0112/km^{2})
- GDP: $590.8 Million (2018)
- Website: easternshoshone.org northernarapaho.com/wp/

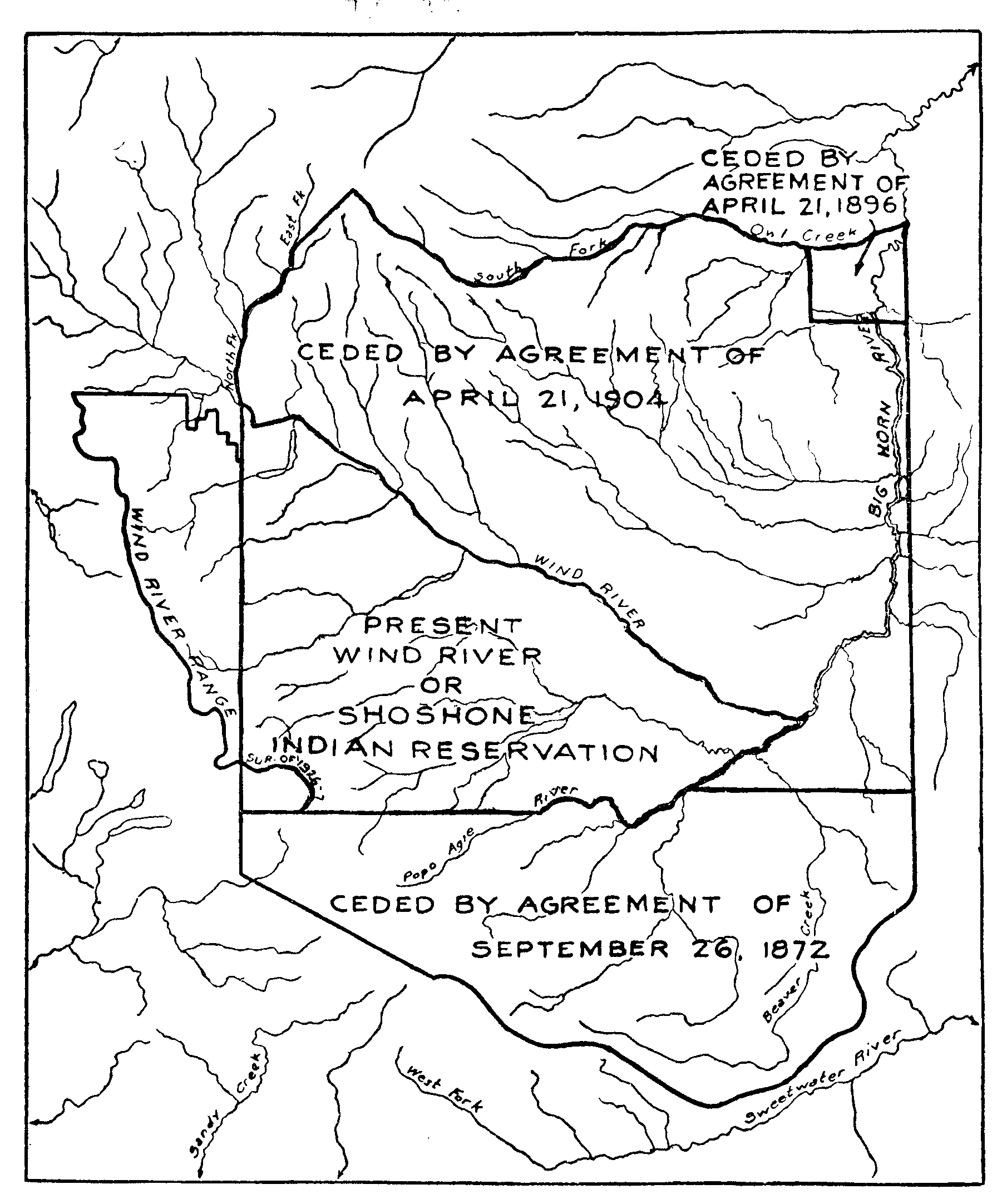
Territory of Wind River Reservation

The Wind River Indian Reservation, in the west-central portion of the U.S. state of Wyoming, is shared by two Native American tribes, the Eastern Shoshone (Shoshoni: Gweechoon Deka, lit. 'Buffalo Eaters') and the Northern Arapaho (Arapaho: Hoteiniiciiheheʼ, lit. 'Bighorn Sheep Creek'). Roughly 60 mi (97 km) east to west by 50 mi (80 km) north to south, the Indian reservation is located in the Wind River Basin, and includes portions of the Wind River Range, Owl Creek Mountains, and Absaroka Range.

The Wind River Indian Reservation is the seventh-largest American Indian reservation in the United States by area and the fifth-largest by population. The land area is approximately 2.2 million acres (3,438 sq mi; 8,903 km^{2}), and the total area (land and water) is 3,532.01 square miles (9,147.9 km^{2}). The reservation constitutes just over one-third of Fremont County and over one-fifth of Hot Springs County.

The 2000 census reported the population of Fremont County as 40,237. According to the 2010 census, only 26,490 people now live on the reservation, with about 15,000 of the residents being non-Indians on ceded lands and the town of Riverton. Tribal headquarters are located at Fort Washakie. The Shoshone Rose Casino (Eastern Shoshone) and the Wind River Hotel and Casino, Little Wind Casino, and 789 Smoke Shop and Casino (all Northern Arapaho) are the only casinos in Wyoming.

== Precontact history ==
The Shoshone has the longest precontact presence in the area. Archaeologists have found evidence that unique aspects of the Tukudika Mountain Shoshone or Sheepeater material culture such as soapstone bowls were in use in this region from the early 19th century going back 1,000 to 3,000 years or more. People descended from the Mountain Shoshone band continue to live on the Wind River Indian Reservation.

The Dinwoody petroglyph style is indigenous to central Wyoming including the Wind River Basin and Bighorn Basin. Scholars believe that the Dinwoody petroglyphs most likely represent the work of ancestral Tukudika or Mountain Shoshone Sheepeaters, because some of the figures at Torrey Lake Petroglyph District and Legend Rock correspond to characters in Shoshone folklore, such as Pa waip, a water spirit woman.

=== Pre-reservation tribal occupation ===
The Wind River Indian Reservation is located at the historical boundary region between the Great Basin culture of the Shoshone and the Great Plains tribal cultures. In recent centuries, the area was used by many tribes for hunting grounds and for raiding.

After 1800, the historical record notes the presence of the Shoshone, as well as the Crow, Cheyenne, Arapaho, Blackfeet, and Lakota in the Wind River Basin. These latter tribes came to the area due to geopolitical forces, as well as for food resources; trapper records after 1800 describe huge herds of tens of thousands of stampeding bison in the Wind River Basin, raising massive clouds of dust on the horizon.

The Shoshone largely controlled much of what is now western Wyoming in the 1700s, because they were the first of the northern tribes to secure horses from the Spanish and traders in the Southwest. (The Arapaho played a similar role of introducing the horse to the Great Plains, through trade between the Spanish settlements along the Rio Grande and the agricultural tribes along the Missouri River.) The Shoshones' dominance in what is now western Wyoming declined as other tribes such as the Blackfeet acquired horses and staged counter-raids. In the 1820s, the Shoshone started to regain power by trading for firearms in the Rocky Mountain Rendezvous fur trade in the Green River Basin, just over the Wind River Range from today's Wind River Indian Reservation.

With the onset of the fur trade, Shoshones could once again project their power east from the Snake River and Green River Valley to hunt buffalo on the plains. Increasingly, they needed to hunt farther east, because the fur trade started to wipe out bison in the Green River Basin. In the 1830s and 1840s, they are recorded as raiding in the Platte River and Powder River basins, and the Laramie Plains. The Shoshone regularly used the Wind River Basin as winter range or as a route to hunting grounds in the Sweetwater, Bighorn Basin, Bighorn Mountains, or Powder River Basin.

Coming from the other direction, the post-1600s westward migration of Siouan and Algonquian-speaking peoples brought new populations onto the plains and traditional Shoshone territory of the middle Rocky Mountains. The earliest of these midwestern, Missouri River, and Great Lakes tribes to migrate to the Great Plains include the Crow, Cheyenne, and Arapaho, though some sources say the Arapaho potentially occupied the Great Plains for 1,000 years. Most of these tribes were initially located on the Great Plains farther north and east of the Wind River area. The powerful and numerous Lakota were the last to push west in response to American expansion, bumping up against the earlier-migrating tribes, and then moving farther west into the Rocky Mountains. By the mid-1800s, all of these tribes would make incursions into the now-contested Wind River valley.

Shoshone place names include dozens in the Bighorn Basin, demonstrating a detailed knowledge of lands further east than the Wind River Basin as part of traditional Shoshone territory. Likewise, the Arapaho were familiar with the Wind River Basin, referring to the Wind River/Bighorn River as Hotee Niicie, meaning "mountain sheep river", in reference to the numerous herds of the species in the area.

By the middle 1800s, the Crow were largely dominant in the Wind River Valley and Absaroka Range, using the area as winter range, and fighting with Shoshones who came into the area. Crow Chief Arapooish mentioned the Wind River Valley as a preferred wintering ground with salt bush and cottonwood bark for horse forage in a speech recorded in the 1830s and published in Washington Irving's Adventures of Captain Bonneville. Meanwhile, Washakie and his people avoided the Crow treaty lands in the Wind River Valley in the 1850s, preferring to hunt away from the emigrant trails and the Crow in places like Henrys Fork and Yellowstone.

The Crow dominance in the Wind River Valley, though secured as official Crow territory under the Fort Laramie Treaty of 1851, effectively ended when Chief Washakie defeated a Crow chief in one-on-one fight at Crowheart Butte, sometime in the late 1850s or early 1860s. Washakie likely opted to challenge the Crow because the emigrant trails and increasing white settlement in Utah, Idaho, and Montana made hunting in those areas harder. This left the Crow-occupied Wind River Valley as the only place Washakie could use force to secure hunting grounds from a rival tribe without significantly opposing American interests.

The Crow legacy in the Wind River persists in the name of the Middle Fork Popo Agie River, pronounced "poepoe-zhuh", which comes from the Crow word Poppootcháashe, an onomatopoeia meaning "plopping river". The Crow word for the Green River, farther west, is Chiichkase Aashe or Seedskadee Aashe, meaning "sage hen river."

The Fort Bridger Treaty Council of 1868 effectively designated the Wind River Valley as exclusive territory of the Shoshone, superseding the Crow's 1851 Fort Laramie treaty claims.

In 1872, the Shoshone agreed to sell part of the reservation to the U.S., establishing the North Fork of the Popo Agie River as a southern border.

=== The reservation era ===
Originally known as the Shoshone Indian Reservation, the Wind River Indian Reservation was established by agreement of the United States with the Eastern Shoshone Nation at the Fort Bridger Treaty Council of 1868, restricting the tribe from the formerly vast Shoshone territory of more than 44 million acres (180,000 km^{2}). A later settlement and land transaction after United States v. Shoshone Tribe of Indians gave the Arapaho legal claim to the reservation, which was renamed the Wind River Indian Reservation.

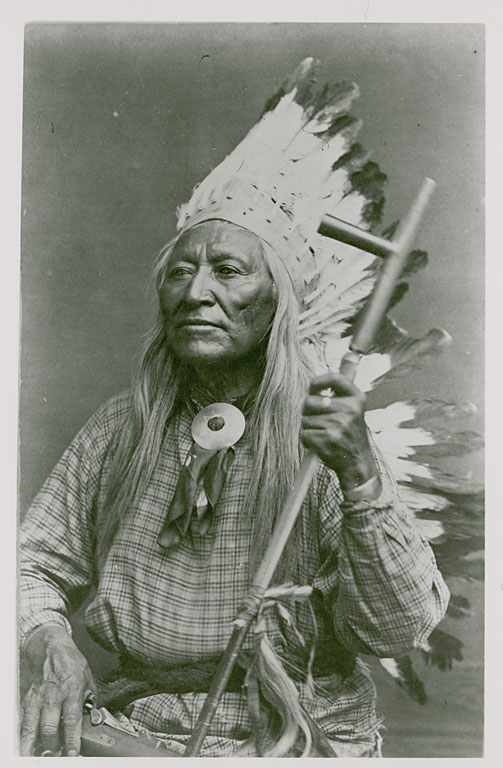
Washakie holding a pipe

The Shoshone leader Washakie had a preference for the area, and had previously defeated the Crow in battle to hold the territory. As early as 1862, Indian Agent Luther Mann Jr. recommended creating a permanent reservation for the Shoshone. After prospectors discovered gold at South Pass in 1867, the United States Indian agent sought to limit numerous tribes from raiding mining camps by placing the Shoshone reservation in the Wind River Valley as a buffer. The United States hoped that tribes like the Crow, Blackfeet, Cheyenne, Lakota, and Arapaho would attack their traditional Shoshone enemies instead of the miners. However, the area was too dangerous for the Shoshone to occupy year-round, so Chief Washakie kept his people closer to Fort Bridger for several years after 1868. Washakie's son was killed in a raid by enemy tribes, and the Oglala Lakota leader Hump, a mentor of Crazy Horse, was killed fighting the Shoshone in the Wind River Basin.

Intertribal conflicts occurred several times in the 1860s and 1870s in the Wind River region. The Arapaho briefly stayed in the Wind River valley in 1870, but left after miners and Shoshones attacked and killed tribal members and Black Bear, one of their leaders, as they moved lodges. At another event, a combined force of Lakotas, Cheyennes, and Arapahos surrounded and attacked Washakie's camp at Trout Creek on the reservation. The Shoshones survived the attack by digging rifle pits inside their tepees, and then mounting a counterattack. The last significant conflict occurred in June 1874, when 167 Shoshones and U.S. cavalry attacked the Arapaho at the Bates Battlefield on the head of Nowood Creek in the Bridger Mountains east of the Shoshone Indian Reservation.

Camp Augur, a military post with troops named for General Christopher C. Augur, was established at the present site of Lander on June 28, 1869. (Augur was the general present at the signing of the Fort Bridger Treaty in 1868.) In 1870 the name of the camp was changed to Camp Brown, and in 1871, the post was moved to the current site of Fort Washakie. The name was changed to honor United States ally and Shoshone Chief Washakie in 1878. The fort continued to serve as a military post until the US abandoned it in 1909. By that time, a community had developed around the fort.

Sacagawea, a guide with the Lewis and Clark Expedition of 1804–06, was later interred here. Her son Jean Baptiste Charbonneau, who was a child on the expedition, has a memorial stone in Fort Washakie but was interred in Danner, Oregon.

A government school and hospital operated for many years east of Fort Washakie; Arapaho children were sent here to board during the school year. St. Michael's at Ethete was constructed in 1917–1920. The village of Arapahoe was originally established as a US sub-agency to distribute rations to the Arapaho. At one time it also operated a large trading post. Irrigation was constructed to support farming and ranching in the arid region. The Arapaho constructed a flour mill near Fort Washakie. Separately, under the Dawes Act, communal tribal land was allotted to individual households, which could later be sold to non-tribal members, further diminishing the tribal land base.

In 1904 the Eastern Shoshone and Northern Arapaho ceded a portion of the reservation north of the Wind River to the United States and opened to white settlement. The Riverton Reclamation Project and the city of Riverton developed on some of this land. Instead of a lump-sum payment or upfront purchase, the cession required the United States to pay the tribes for each area of land settled upon. Seeing that large parts of the ceded area were never taken up by settlers, the ceded portion of the reservation was later restored to the Eastern Shoshone and Northern Arapaho tribes.

==== Arapaho settlement on Wind River ====
In the winter of 1878–79, the United States Army escorted the Northern Arapaho to the Sweetwater Valley near Independence Rock and then temporarily placed them at the Shoshone's Fort Washakie Agency to receive rations. This decision to place the Arapaho in close proximity with their historic enemies the Shoshone has had significant historical and political consequences.

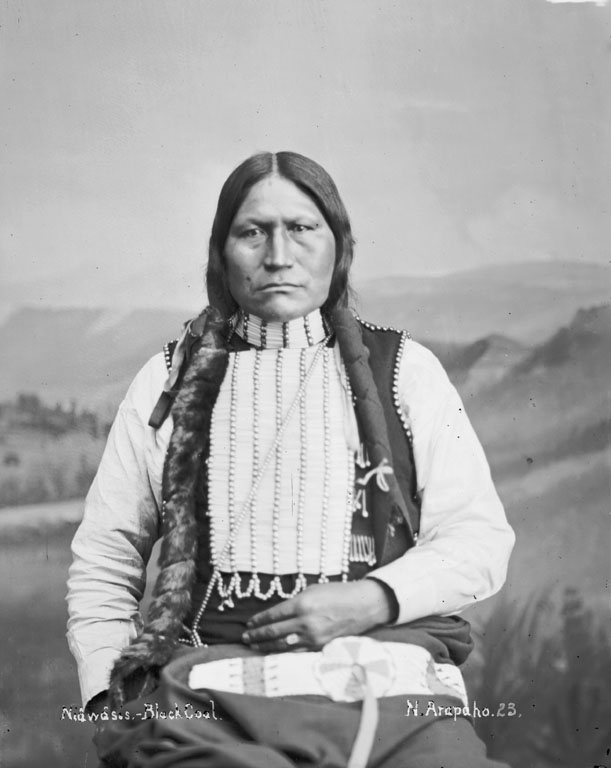
Chief Black Coal, among the most influential Arapaho chiefs of his time. Chief Black Coal was able to largely keep the Arapaho at peace with the United States during the Great Sioux War of 1876. He served as a U.S. Army scout and helped the tribe find a home on Wind River.

The former Arapaho and Cheyenne reservation under the Fort Laramie Treaty of 1851 encompassing much of eastern Colorado and southeast Wyoming had been overrun by whites after the Colorado gold rush of 1859. The Northern Arapaho then signed the Fort Laramie Treaty of 1868, giving them claim to locate in the Great Sioux Reservation, encompassing the western half of present-day South Dakota west of the Missouri River, and rights to hunt north of the Platte River in Wyoming so long as game remained.

In practice the Arapaho did not wish to locate permanently at an agency shared by the Sioux. They were belittled by leaders of the more powerful Sioux including Red Cloud, and wanted to avoid being culturally subsumed within the Lakota Nation. Instead, the Arapaho hoped for a reservation of their own. In 1868–69, the Arapaho briefly sought to locate with the linguistically related Gros Ventres at the agency on the Milk River in Montana, but left after a smallpox epidemic. Further, Arapaho priest and leader Weasel Bear had a vision that the Arapaho would find a permanent home closer to the Rocky Mountains, and not on the Great Plains. The Arapaho way of life had historically included significant use of mountain hunting grounds, especially in the Colorado Rockies around Estes Park, but also including the Snowy Range, the Bighorns, the Black Hills, and the Laramie Range.

To seek favor of the Army, leaders Chief Black Coal (Northern Arapaho), Sharp Nose and their followers allied with Gen. George Crook as scouts against their former allies the Cheyenne, participating in the November 1876 Dull Knife Fight on the side of the United States, along with Shoshone, Cheyenne, Sioux, and Pawnee scouts. Officers of the United States Army supported the idea of an Arapaho reservation in eastern Wyoming Territory — General Crook may have promised an agency on the Tongue River. Yet federal policy prevented this from coming to fruition, partly because the United States had essentially stopped negotiating reservation treaties with tribes after 1868, preferring instead to use executive orders in such agreements.

In 1878 the U.S. Army saw the onset of winter with roughly 1,000 hungry and impoverished Arapaho still averse to living near the Red Cloud Agency, at an agreed-upon agency of Fort Randall, or in Indian Territory with the Southern Arapaho. Chief Black Coal had previously visited the Southern Arapaho reservation on the Canadian River in Oklahoma, finding the location unacceptable. So, Army officers looked to Fort Washakie as the closest alternate agency for distributing rations, despite the fact that the Shoshone held treaty rights to decide what other tribes they were willing to admit to the reservation under the Fort Bridger Treaty Council of 1868.

The supposedly temporary placement of the Arapaho at Fort Washakie Agency became permanent because the United States government never took further action to relocate the tribe. The Arapaho held out hope for a reservation of their own until 1890, when Gen. Crook died. In late-1800s dealings including land cessions, the government repeatedly acted as if the Arapaho were a party of their reservation and its resources by including them in cession discussions like the sale of the Thermopolis Hot Springs. This was despite Shoshone protests (which were later held up in court) that the Arapaho had no legal claim to the reservation. According to historian Loretta Fowler, Arapaho leaders at the time were aware they had no real legal status to reservation land in the Wind River Valley. They participated in land cessions and allotment of reservation land in part to solidify their title and claims to the land.

It wasn't until the conclusion of the 1938 U.S. Supreme Court Case United States v. Shoshone Tribe of Indians that the government recognized it had wrongly given Shoshone land and resources to the Arapaho. A subsequent land deal then officially solidified Arapaho claim as half-owners of tribal lands and resources on the Shoshone Indian Reservation, which was officially renamed the Wind River Indian Reservation.

This complicated history of the Arapaho arrival on the reservation continues to affect intertribal relations and politics on the reservation today. Over time, intermarriage between members of the two tribes has occurred, building connections between members of the historically enemy tribes and encouraging political cooperation. Yet efforts to maintain and exert independent sovereignty of each tribe remain a major dynamic on the reservation.

==== Mid-20th century to present ====
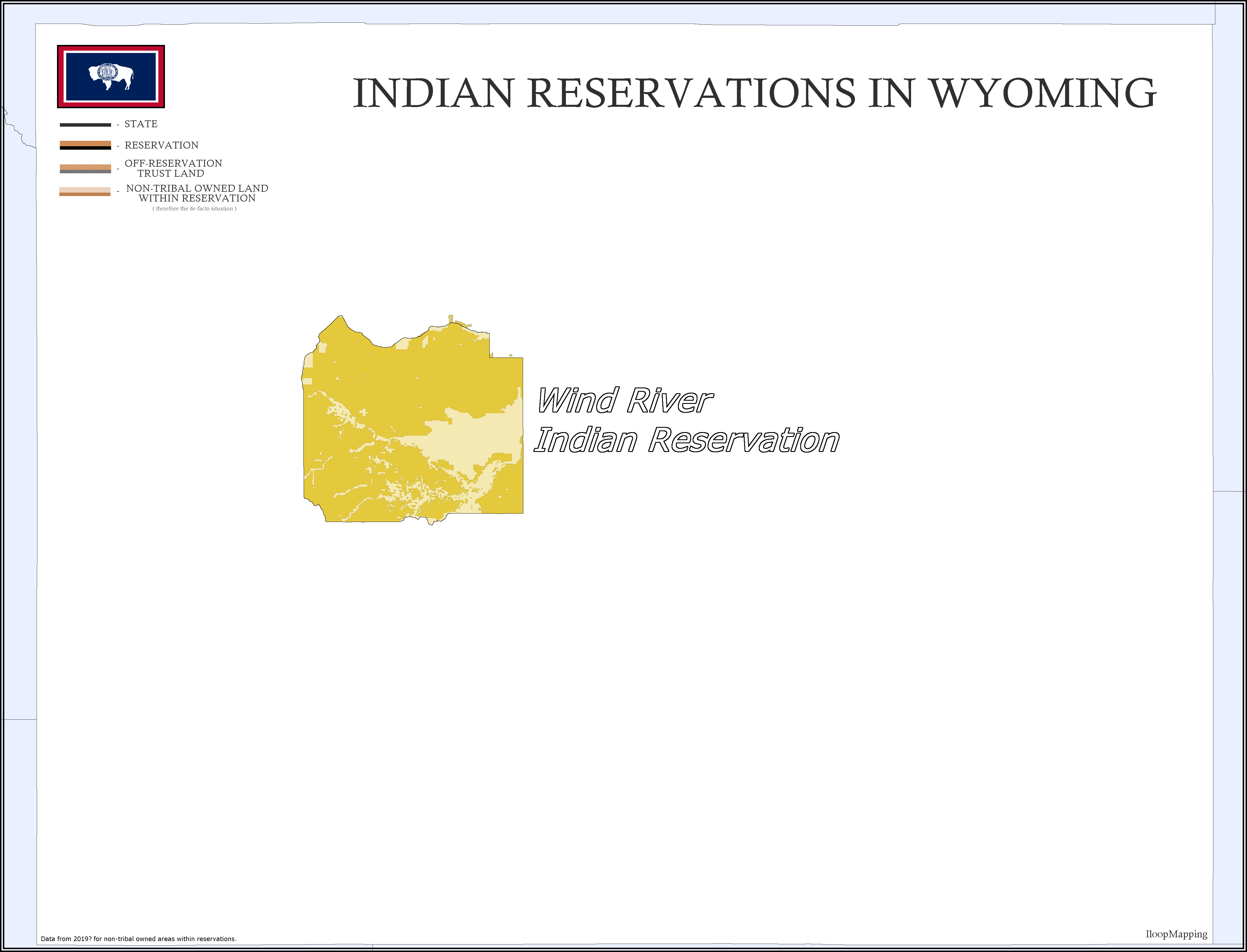
Map of the Wind River Reservation, with shown tribal land.

In the 1970s and 1980s, oil and gas operators on the Wind River Indian Reservation were found to be stealing oil from the Eastern Shoshone and Northern Arapaho. In a coordinated scheme, companies extracted oil and paid some production royalties to tribes, while also secretly collecting and selling a separate supply of oil for which they paid no royalties. The exposé led to reforms.

Of the population in 2011, 3,737 were Shoshone and 8,177 were Arapaho. There were 1,888,000 acres (7,640 km^{2}) of tribal land with 180,387 acres (730.00 km^{2}) of wilderness area. In 2000, 6,728 (28.9%) were Native Americans (full or part) and of them 54% were Arapaho and 30% Shoshone. In October 2019, the Eastern Shoshone Tribes became signatories to the Buffalo Treaty and later in June 2022 the Northern Arapaho Tribe signed as well.

===== Wildlife conservation =====
The Wind River Indian Reservation established a 180,000-acre (730 km^{2}) roadless area in the Wind River Range in the 1930s, several decades before the passage of the national Wilderness Act of 1964. The tribes have re-established populations of big game, such as moose, wolf, elk, mule deer, white-tailed deer, bighorn sheep and pronghorn, and have passed hunting regulations to conserve these species.

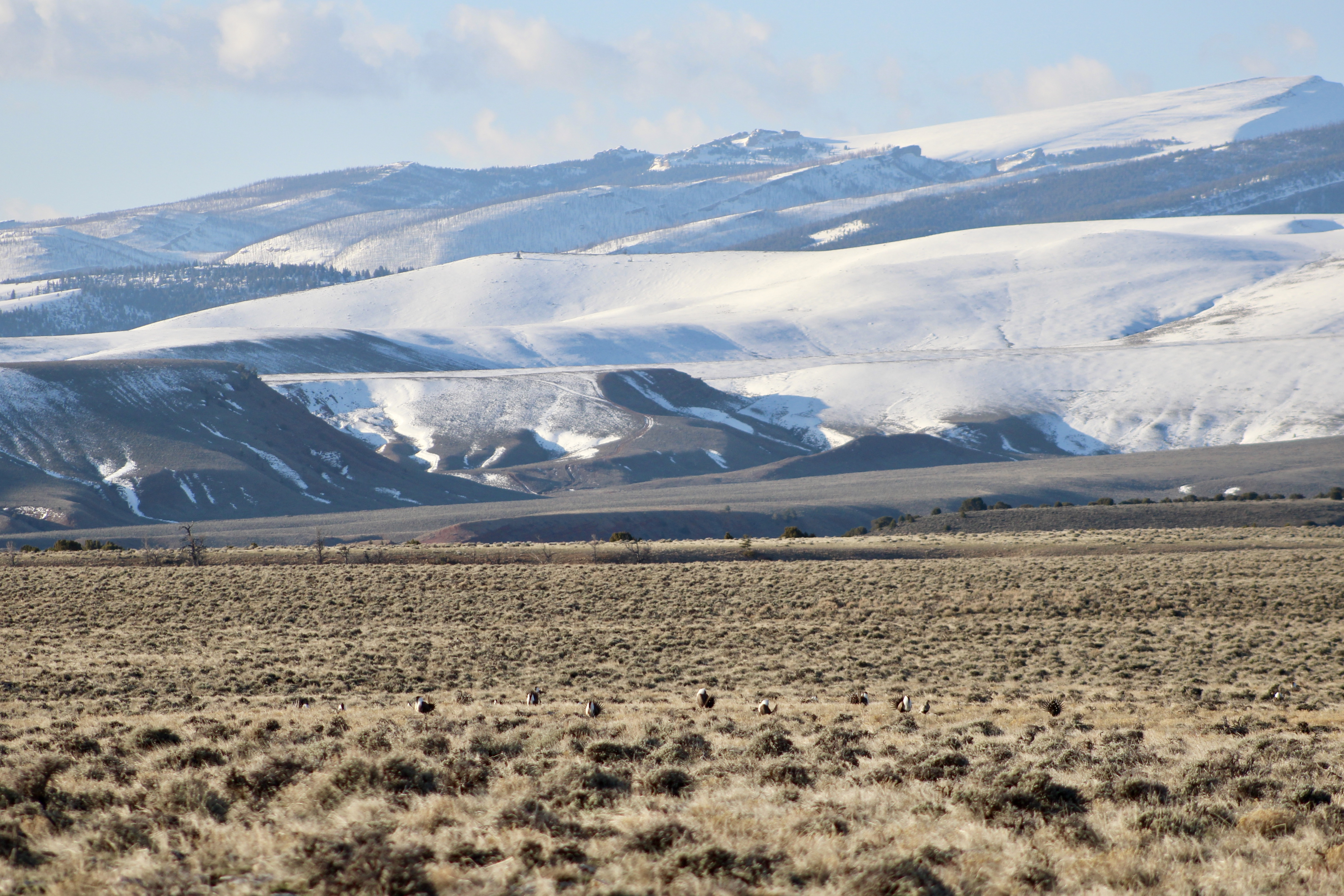
Greater Sage-Grouse on Wind River Reservation

The Wind River Tribal Buffalo Initiative is restoring free roaming buffalo to the reservation. In November 2016 the Shoshone introduced ten buffalo to the reservation, the beginning of what is planned as a 1,000-head herd. They were the first buffalo to be seen on the Wind River Reservation since 1885. The tribe is also receiving buffalo from Yellowstone National Park that are coming out of quarantine at the Fort Peck Indian Reservation. Area suited as buffalo habitat is estimated at 700,000 acres (2,800 km^{2}) on the west side and another 500,000 acres (2,000 km^{2}) on the north of the reservation. In 2025, the tribe designated buffalo as wildlife instead of livestock. The herd had about 140 animals in 2026.

The Northern Arapaho established a buffalo herd in 2019. By 2026, the herd had expanded to just over a hundred.

== Tourism ==
=== Lodging and museums ===
Facilities for tourism include hotels located at the Wind River Casino and the Shoshone Rose Casino. There are numerous cultural centers and interpretive displays at the Eastern Shoshone Cultural Center and library at Fort Washakie School, as well as the Northern Arapaho Experience Room at the Wind River Hotel and Casino. The Museum of the American West in Lander hosts weekly powwow dancing demonstrations during the summer.

=== Fishing, hiking, mountaineering, and rafting ===
The Wind River Indian Reservation allows access for fishing and hiking for non-tribal members who purchase a tribal fishing license available from local retailers. The license allows access to fishing lands on the southern half of the reservation, including in the tribal roadless area that encompasses part of the Wind River Range. Hikers and mountaineers seeking the closest approach to Gannett Peak can hire a guide to drive into a trailhead. The reservation licenses contractors in Thermopolis to offer whitewater rafting and fishing outfitting in the Wind River Canyon.

=== Powwows ===
The Wind River Country, the wide expansion of land on which the Wind River Reservation resides, provides opportunities for visitors to see and participate in important cultural experiences.

Scheduled powwows are available to attend by the public. There are three larger celebrations throughout the year in Wind River Country, including the Eastern Shoshone Powwow in June, the Ethete Celebration in July, and the Northern Arapaho Powwow in September. These ceremonies are an important aspect of Native American culture, that involve feasting, singing and dancing.

An important aspect of the powwow is showcasing the regalia of the dancers. Each piece is personally significant to the dancer, uniquely handmade, utilizing feathers, shells, bones, beadwork and sometimes family heirlooms. The dances performed are traditional dances, unique to the tribe they belong to, as is the music. The spectacle is described on the Wind River Country's tourism website, telling prospective visitors, "If you close your eyes for a second the music will sweep you away. Drumming and singing accompanies all dancing and the drumbeat is considered sacred, representing the heartbeat of the tribe. Each thumping note carries songs to the Great Spirit, along with the prayers of the people." The website also advertises the powwows as being free admission.

== In popular culture ==
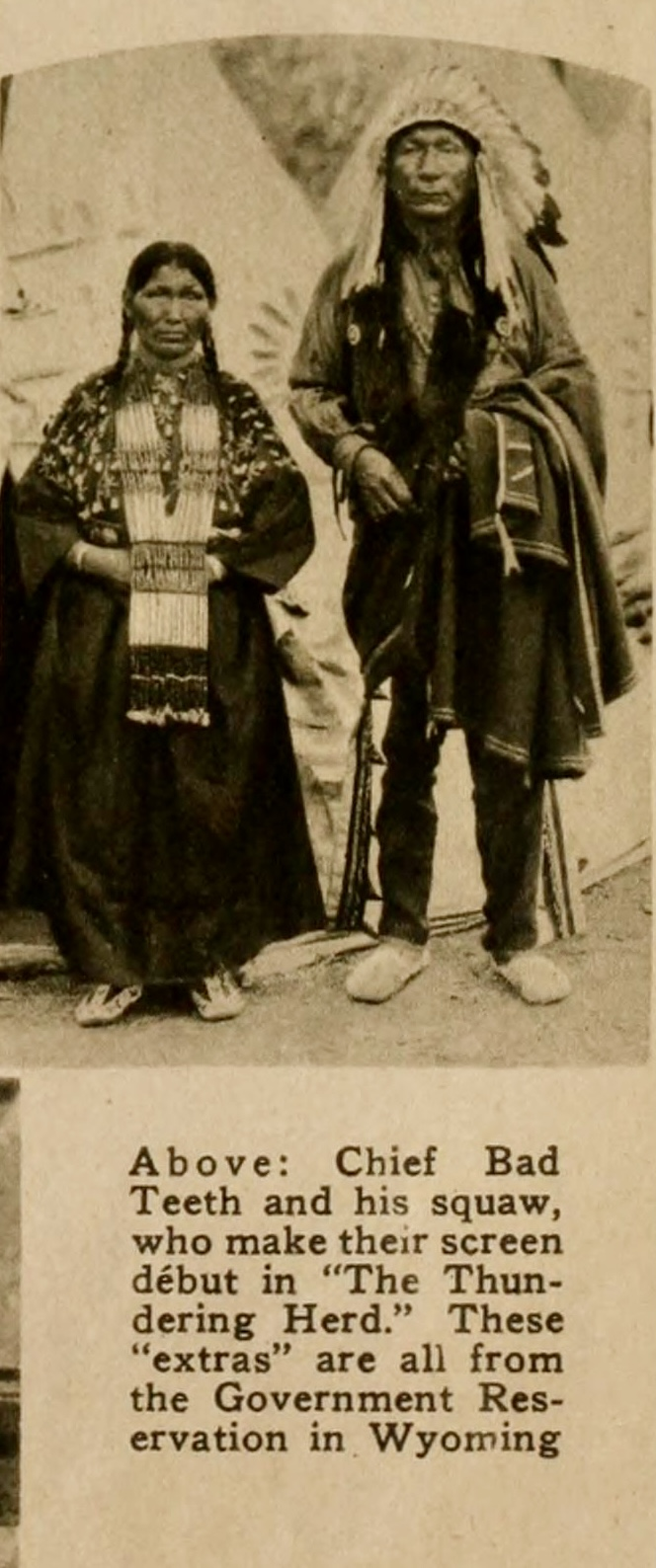
Bad Teeth, his unidentified female partner, and other residents of Wind River appeared in the 1923 production of a Zane Grey film, The Thundering Herd. Bad Teeth also appeared in MGM's 1926 War Paint. (Motion Picture Classic, 1925)

- PBS aired the documentary film Chiefs, filmed from 2000 to 2001 by Daniel Junge, about the members of the successful high school basketball team on the Wind River Reservation.
- Margaret Coel has written a series of mystery novels set on the Wind River Reservation featuring Arapaho attorney Vicky Holden and Father John O'Malley, pastor of the fictional St. Francis mission. The actual Roman Catholic mission on the reservation is the Saint Stephen's Indian Mission.
- In 2017, the film Wind River was released. Written and directed by Taylor Sheridan, it stars Jeremy Renner, Elizabeth Olsen, Graham Greene and Gil Birmingham. Set in winter, the thriller mystery explores the death of a young Arapaho woman on the reservation and social conditions there. The film shows depictions of sexual assault on reservations.
- Facebook produced the film Good Medicine by director Jackson Tisi to show the broad definition of "good medicine" today on the reservation, ranging from traditional spiritual practices and powwow dancing to skateboarding.

== Contemporary issues ==
Current social and economic conditions on the Wind River Indian Reservation have complicated historical roots. The reservation has many examples of cultural survival, adaptation, and patriotism. Yet the reservation community also suffers from the legacy of settler colonialism, dispossession from land, forced assimilation and cultural destruction, family disruption, environmental extraction and degradation, disenfranchisement, and inter-generational poverty. Though media portrayals produced by outsiders frequently note these disparities, tribal members have publicly objected to such narratives, noting that they are not the whole story of life in reservation communities.

High Country News tribal desk editor Tristan Ahtone (Kiowa) used Wind River media coverage by the New York Times, CNN, and Business Insider as examples of simplistic negative narratives that future journalists can work to disrupt through accurate portrayals of Native American realities, both good and bad.

=== Crime on the reservation and media portrayals ===
In 2009, three young Native American girls (13, 14, and 15 years of age) were murdered on the reservation. They were found in the bedroom of a small home in Beaver Creek, which is a low-income tribal housing community. They had overdosed on methadone, a painkiller which is used to wean heroin addicts off of heroin. No one knows how they received the painkillers, which is why the coroner ruled their deaths homicides. The reservation has a very thin police force, which led to the FBI being the lead investigators on the homicide. The reservation has six officers who are responsible for patrolling an area about the size of Rhode Island. Two teenage boys were arrested in connection with the girls' deaths. One boy had given them his grandmother's methadone, saying that the girls were already high and he wanted to help them, because they didn't want to go home and have their parents see them.

In the early 21st century, the media reported problems of reservation poverty and unemployment, resulting in associated crime and a high rate of drug abuse. In 2012, The New York Times released an article titled "Brutal Crimes Grip an Indian Reservation". According to this article, written by Timothy Williams, an Iraq war strategy, "the surge", was used to attempt to fight crime, taking hundreds of officers from the National Park Service and other federal agencies. This had major success at other reservations, but on the Wind River Indian Reservation, violent crime increased by seven percent. In 2013, Business Insider produced a photo scrapbook and indicated locals refer to different streets by infamously violent American locations such as Compton near Los Angeles.

The reservation was experiencing a methamphetamine crisis that has since been significantly reduced, even while addiction continues to be a problem. Other residents say the Wind River Indian Reservation is a more hopeful place than is often portrayed in press reports.

=== Public health ===
There are two outpatient clinics located on the reservation. There is one located in Arapahoe, and the second one is located in Fort Washakie. The clinics offer a variety of services such as Behavioral Health, Social Services, Business Office, Community Health Nursing, Purchased/Referred Care (PRC), Dental, Diabetes Program, Laboratory/Radiology, Medical Records, Medical Services, Nursing, Optometry, Office of Environmental Health, Utilization Review and Compliance. The average life expectancy for someone living on the reservation is 49 years.

According to A Suicide Epidemic in an American Indian Community, a study done regarding suicide on the reservation in 1985, the months of August and September produced very high suicide numbers. There were 12 reported deaths, and 88 additional verified instances of suicide threats or suicidal attempts. This epidemic among Native American tribes can be attributed to high unemployment and abuse of alcohol. 40 of the attempts were between the ages of 13 and 19, and 24 attempts were between the ages of 20 and 29. Of the 88 attempts, alcohol was involved in 47 cases, with 46 male and 42 females attempting suicide. Many events were created to attempt to stop this suicide epidemic that hit the reservation. Parents and elder community members closed bingo nights for children and hosted recreational activities instead. The schools extended hours for learning centers and gymnasiums. An alcohol treatment program began holding weekly alcohol-free teen dances, which were very popular and had a high attendance. These initiatives were designed to provide a safe and alcohol-free environment for the children and young adults. This ultimately helped quell the epidemic, and prevented suicide attempts across such young age groups.

An article published in 2001, The Social Construction of American Indian Drinking: Perceptions of American Indian and White Officials, discovered, by qualitatively interviewing a small sample size of 12 Native Americans residing on the reservation and 12 Whites who also reside on the reservation, that alcoholism is present on the reservation. 10 of 12 Natives said that alcohol is a problem shared by both minors and adults, while all 12 Whites said this. 10 of 12 American Indians said that alcohol is strongly linked to crime, while 11 of 12 Whites agreed. The biggest outlier was that only 8 of 12 American Indians said that alcohol is a very serious problem on the reservation, while 11 of 12 Whites said the same. In an article in the Casper Star-Tribune, of the 79 deaths from 2004, a quarter of the deaths were attributed to alcoholic cirrhosis and half were alcoholic deaths due to car crashes and homicide connected to drugs. According to Cathy Keene, local director for Indian Health Services, the reservation's situation has gotten to the point where the Public Health Service can only fund things that require emergency care. The lack of funding has resulted in fewer surgeries and medical procedures. The Fort Washakie Health Center is only working with slightly more than half of its needed funding, according to Richard Brannan, chief executive officer of the Indian Health Service.

A study found that approximately 71% of the population is obese and 12% have diabetes, compared to the national average 36.5% and 9.4%. In 2009, the reservation received a five-year grant in funding from the Merck Foundation's Alliance for Reducing Diabetes Disparities (ARDD) to improve patient care, community clinical system of care, and clinicians. The ultimate goal of the funding is to find an ideal model or solution that can be repeated at other reservations to decrease the rate of diabetes. After receiving funding, the project team gathered other members who shared an interest in preventing and managing diabetes on the reservation. They recruited members of the Wind Reservation Coalition for Diabetes Management and Prevention, Wind River Indian Health Service, Fremont County Public Health, the University of Wyoming's Centsible Nutrition Program, Sundance Research Institute, and the State of Wyoming Department of Health's Diabetes Prevention program. These members helped create focus groups consisting of residents from the reservation to understand the barriers and the issues with health services. The group created a disease management program based on the Chronic Care Model which focused on looking at members with or at risk of diabetes. They created specific exercises and nutrition programs that took account of the lifestyle and culture of the residents. For individuals who were already diagnosed, the program created a self-management education program. After the five-year program, the results showed improved clinical outcomes. 47% of the participants saw a decrease in their HbA1c levels, improved diabetes management with a mean decrease of 1.12 points. Due to the success of the program, a two-year grant from the AstraZeneca Foundation proposed to help 350 reservation residents who are at risk for cardiovascular disease.

=== Education and employment ===
Only 60% of Native Americans complete high school, compared to 80% of White students. The Wind River Reservation dropout rate is 40%, more than twice the state average of Wyoming. Teenagers are twice as likely to commit suicide compared to other young adults within Wyoming. There are other issues that commonly occur on the reservation such as child abuse, teenage pregnancy, sexual assault, domestic violence, and alcoholism. There was the death of an eighth grader at Wyoming Indian Middle School who was killed by voluntary manslaughter in April 2010. Wind River's crime rate is five to seven times the national average, and the reservation has a history of gang violence. The reservation has struggled with an alarming percent of unemployment. According to a 2005 Bureau of Indian Affairs report, the Northern Arapaho Tribe's unemployment rate was 73%, and Eastern Shoshone's was 84%. Other reservations have similar or higher rates of unemployment.

There does seem to be a consensus on what some of the contributing factors are. One is lack of adequate physical infrastructure—good roads and bridges, public water supply and sanitation facilities, and adequate education. The Wyoming Department of Education decided to collaborate with the North Central Comprehensive Center in order to improve the reservation's education system. They conducted multiple listening sessions within classes of different schools within the reservation. After the sessions, parents and students came to the consensus that the Wind River Reservation schools needed more teachers that are Native American. They also advocated for more security in order to lessen bullying and gangs, and more Native American-relevant courses, such as their Native American language. Lastly, students and parents wanted a standard for academic expectations that should be held within all schools within the reservation. One of the parents remarked, "My grandson goes to the school in Lander. We won't transfer him back here to the reservation because they're two years behind where my grandson is." Megan Degenfelder, Wyoming Department of Education Policy Advisor, said the inputs from the listening sessions has the department headed in the right track "to improve education for Native American students and to best be able to allocate our resources and time."

=== Environmental ===
According to Folo Akintan's preliminary data, a medical doctor and epidemiologist from the Rocky Mountain Tribal Epidemiology Center in Billings, Montana, four out of ten Wind River Reservation residents reported that they have had a relative die from cancer. Many of the residents believe it is due to a uranium mill and contamination plume near St. Stephens. In 1958 Susquehanna–Western began processing uranium and vanadium ore on the reservation with sulfuric acid. Although the mill closed in 1963, there were tailings left behind. In 1988 the Department of Energy (DOE) found that soils, surface water and shallow groundwater were all contaminated. The DOE believes the land will naturally flush itself and be contamination-free 100 years from now. In 2010, the DOE recorded levels of contamination 100 times higher than what is allowed by the USEPA Maximum Contaminant Level (MCL) for drinking water. Tribal officials were worried about their water sources being contaminated by these deadly toxins. The DOE placed plastic PVC for the water pipeline. They reassured the residents that it was secure and wouldn't break; however, Wind River Environmental Quality Commission officials state that the pipe has broken multiple times within the past year. The residents have become fed up with the DOE due to lack of cleaning up the land, poor pipeline equipment, and lack of spreading data about the high levels of contamination from flooding. Although it's hard to suggest that a uranium tailing site is causing an increased cancer rate, Dr. Akintan suggests, "It is a risk indicator." The cancer rates on the reservation are higher than the national and state average. Although Dr. Akintan's reports show an increased cancer rate, the research had many limitations. The first limitation was lack of responses returned. There was a total of 3,000 surveys and only 286 were completed. Also, the data collected was only self-reported data which is unreliable due to response bias from the participants. Also, the results were leading but not statistically significant.

== Education ==
In 1993, the Northern Arapaho Tribe on the Wind River Reservation began a relationship with a high school in Centennial, Colorado, to "[promote] awareness to the co-existence of two very diverse cultures." Despite previous controversy, Arapahoe High School and the Arapaho Nation established an agreement, in which the tribe endorsed the school mascot, the "Arapahoe Warrior". The image of the mascot used by the school was drawn by Northern Arapaho artist Wilbur Antelope. The agreement also promised a long-standing relationship between the school and the tribe. Signed September 17, 1993, this proclamation allowed for the "Arapahoe Warrior" to become a reminder of Elder Anthony Sitting Eagle's words, "Always take care of one another," a phrase repeated often by students and faculty at Arapahoe High School.

As part of the agreement, Arapahoe High School and the Arapaho Nation alternate visiting each other every year. When the Arapaho tribe comes to visit the school, the daily activities are put on pause for an assembly. Arapahoe High School students accompany those visiting from the Wind River Reservation and file into the large gymnasium, renamed in December 1994 after Arapaho Elder Anthony Sitting Eagle. Two cultures unite for a celebration, the Arapaho tribe performing traditional dances and the tribal leaders speaking to the students. When the students visit the Wind River Reservation, they take a tour of the school and learn more about the Arapaho Nation's culture.

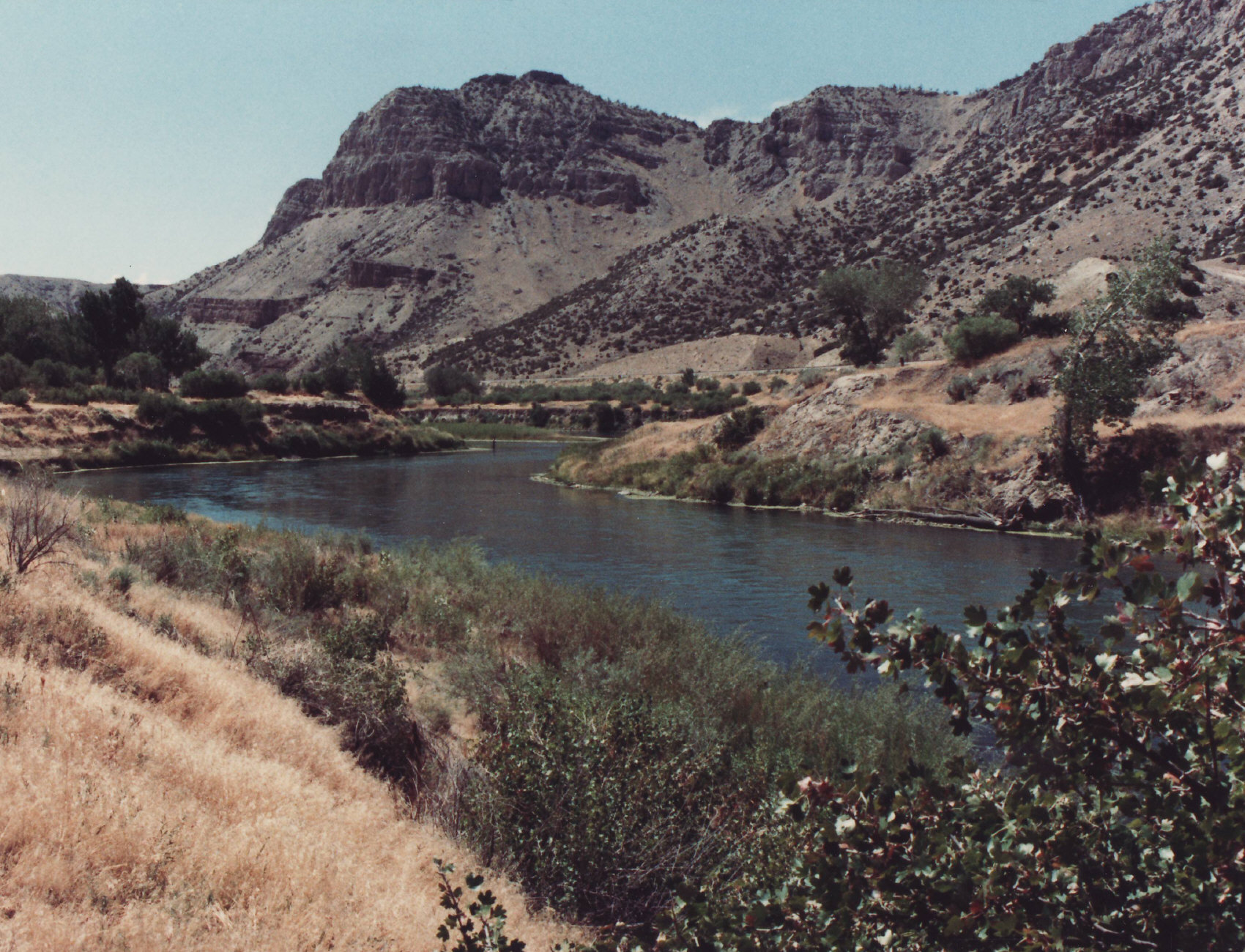
The Wind River at the Wind River Indian Reservation, Wyoming

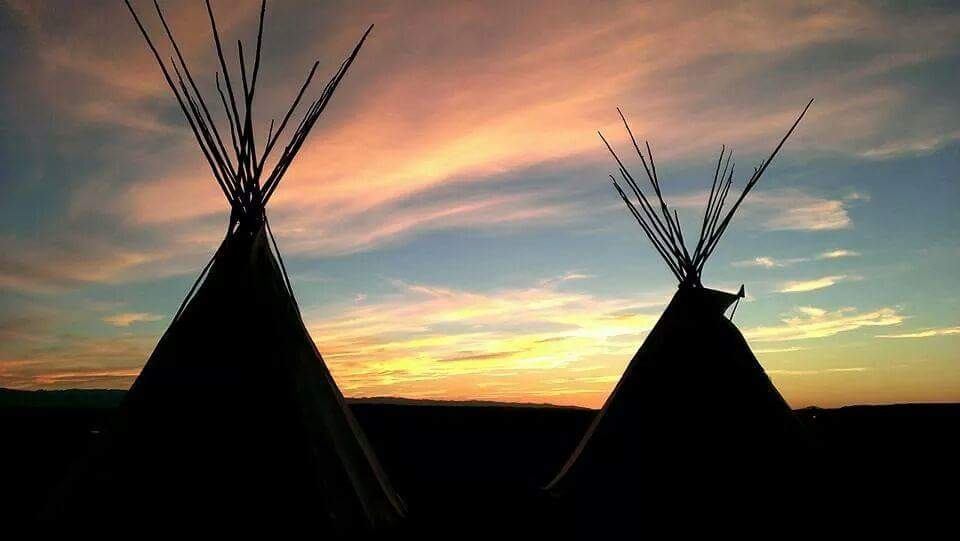
Sunset with tepees on the Wind River Indian Reservation

Flag of the Eastern Shoshone tribe

Flag of the Northern Arapaho tribe

== Communities ==
- Arapahoe
- Boulder Flats
- Crowheart
- Embar
- Ethete
- Fort Washakie
- Hudson (part, population 72)
- Johnstown
- Kinnear
- Midvale
- Pavilion
- Riverton
- Willow Creek

== See also ==
- Friday, interpreter and negotiator
- Wind River Tribal College
