= United States v. Shoshone Tribe of Indians =

- Supreme Court of the United States

Argued March 31 – April 1, 1938 Decided April 25, 1938
- Full case name: United States v. Shoshone Tribe of Indians
- Citations: 304 U.S. 111 (more) 58 S. Ct. 794; 82 L. Ed. 1213; 1938 U.S. LEXIS 1085

Holding
- "By the Treaty of 1868 the Shoshone Tribe had acquired the mineral and timber rights of the reservation."

Court membership
- Chief Justice Charles E. Hughes Associate Justices James C. McReynolds · Louis Brandeis; Pierce Butler · Harlan F. Stone; Owen Roberts · Benjamin N. Cardozo; Hugo Black · Stanley F. Reed

Case opinions
- Majority: Butler, joined by Hughes, McReynolds, Brandeis, Roberts, Black
- Dissent: Reed
- Stone and Cardozo took no part in the consideration or decision of the case.

United States v. Shoshone Tribe of Indians of the Wind River Reservation in Wyoming, 304 U.S. 111 (1938), was a United States Supreme Court case in which the Court held that mineral rights on a reservation belonged to the tribe, not the federal government.

== Background ==
By the Treaty of July 2, 1863 the United States set apart for the Shoshone Tribe of Indians of the Wind River Reservation, a reservation of 44,672,000 acres (18,078,000 ha) located in Colorado, Utah, Idaho, and Wyoming. By the Treaty of July 3, 1868, the tribe ceded this reservation to the United States. The US agreed that 3,054,182 acres (1,235,984 ha) definitely described acres called the "district of country" would be set aside for the absolute and undisturbed use and occupation of the Shoshone Indians. The US also agreed that no persons would be permitted to pass over, settle upon, or reside in that territory. The Shoshone Tribe subsequently made the reservation their permanent home.

At the time the 1868 Treaty was made, the tribe consisted of full-blood Indians who were unable to read, write, or speak English. The reservation contained valuable mineral deposits of gold, oil, coal, and gypsum as well as over 400,000 acres (160,000 ha) of timber. In 1904, the Shoshones and Arapahoes ceded to the US 1,480,000 acres (600,000 ha) to be held by it in trust for the sale of timber, timber lands, and for the making of leases. The net proceeds were to be credited to the Indians. There were 245,058 acres (99,171 ha) allotted to members of the tribes from 1907 to 1919.

The Court found the fair value of a one-half interest of the Shoshone reservation of a total of 2,343,540 acres (948,400 ha), which was taken by the US for the Arapahoes on March 19, 1878, to be US$1,581,889.50. The lower court concluded that the tribe's interest in the land by the Treaty of 1868 included ownership of the mineral and timber rights. The Government appealed to the Supreme Court and asked for reversal with directions to determine the value of the Indians' right of use and occupancy excluding the value of any timber or minerals.

== Opinion of the Court ==
Justice Pierce Butler delivered the opinion of the court. The case was argued March 21 and April 18, 1938, and was decided on April 25, 1938. The Supreme Court affirmed the lower court ruling and held that by the Treaty of 1868 the Shoshone Tribe had acquired the mineral and timber rights of the reservation. The Court reasoned that the minerals and standing timber were elements of the land itself and that for all practical purposes, the Tribe owned the land. The language of the Treaty did not suggest that the US intended to retain for itself any interest in the minerals or timber. The Court ultimately concluded that the lower court was correct in holding that the right of the Shoshone Tribe included the timber and minerals within the reservation.
