= National Bison Day =

Annual celebration

National Bison Day is an annual celebration in the United States of the significance of the American bison. A campaign is underway to pass federal legislation officially recognizing the first Saturday of each November as National Bison Day. Although the legislation has so far failed to pass, the Senate has passed a resolution each year since 2013 recognizing the day.

The day is celebrated at sites involved in the conservation of American bison. In addition to organizing, sponsoring and attending local bison-related events and celebrations, the Beards for Bison campaign encouraged supporters to discuss National Bison Day on social media via hashtags and selfies.

== Legislation ==
For several years, bison supporters have continued a "Vote Bison" campaign seeking to make the American bison the "National Mammal of the United States" and have National Bison Day officially designated as the first Saturday in November each year. The Senate has shown its approval by passing a resolution about the day each year, in recent years led by Senators Mike Enzi (R-WY) and Joe Donnelly (D-IN) and co-sponsored by a bipartisan group of senators.

The House and Senate respectively passed the H.R. 2908 (114th) bill, the National Bison Legacy Act, on April 26 and 28, 2016, officially recognizing the bison as the national mammal, and President Obama signed the National Bison Legacy Act into law on 9 May. The bison was officially designated as the national mammal at a ceremony at Wind Cave National Park in South Dakota at the start of Native American Month, on 1 November 2016.
