= Secwepemc Nation =

Secwepemc Nation may refer to:

- the Secwepemc people (aka the Shuswap people)
- the Shuswap Nation Tribal Council
- the Northern Shuswap Tribal Council
