= Indigenous economics =

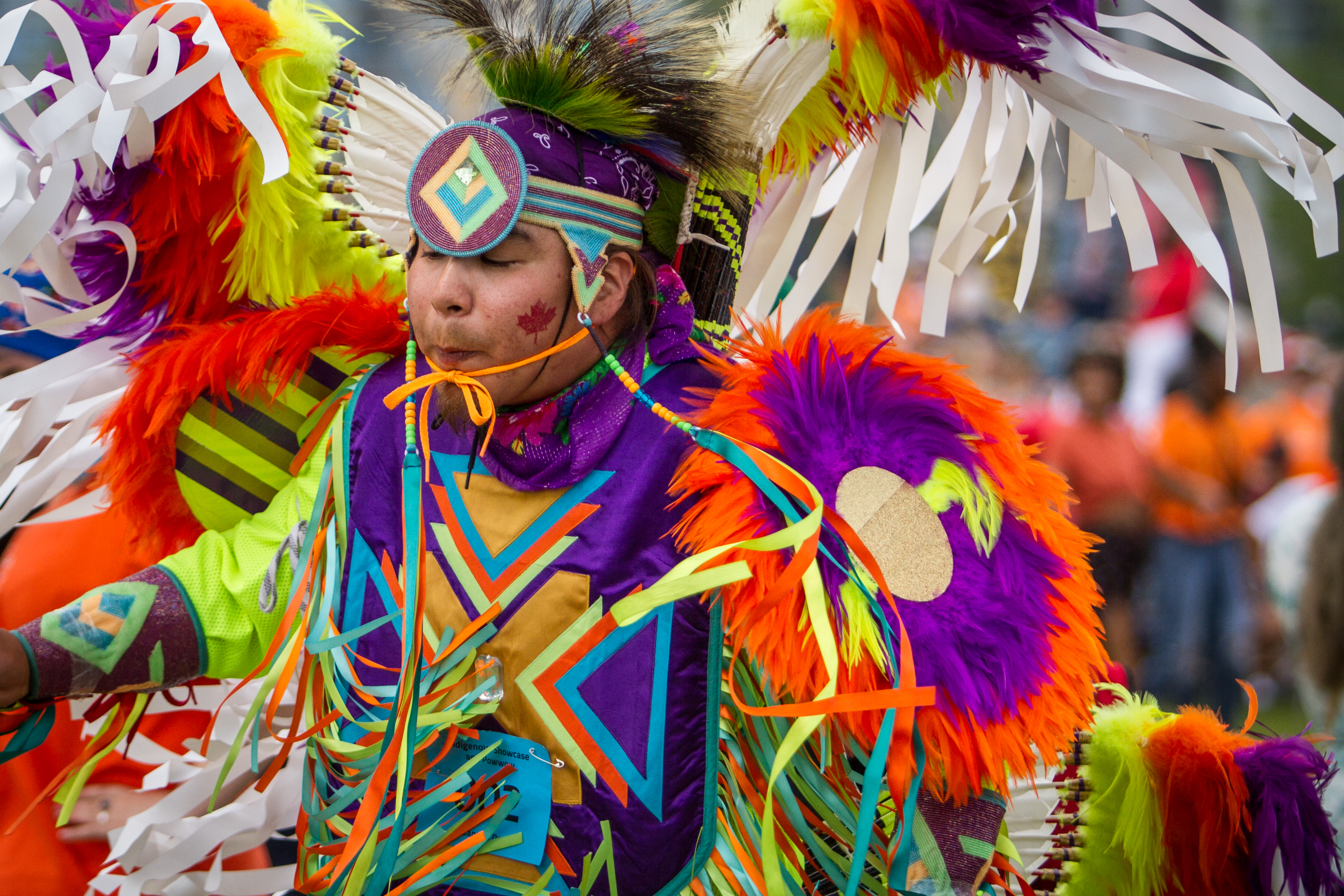
Canada Day celebrations in Calgary, Alberta in 2022

Indigenous economics is a field of economic study that explores the economic systems, practices, theories, and philosophies unique to indigenous peoples. This approach to economics examines how such groups understand, interact with, and manage resources within their specific cultural contexts. Indigenous economics puts emphasis on communal values, sustainability, and connection with land and environment.

== History ==
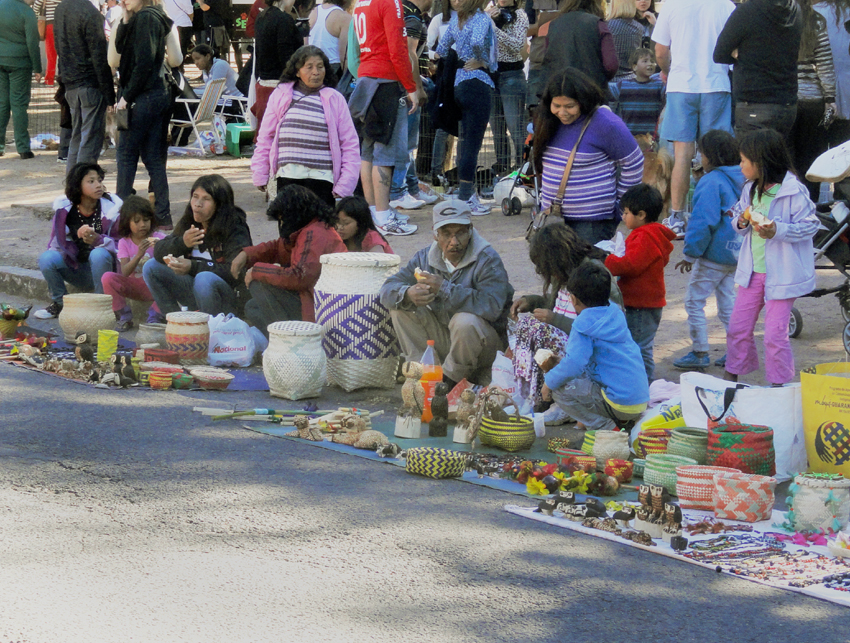
Urban natives in Brazil

Indigenous economics emerged in the latter half of the 20th century as scholars attempted to gain a broader understanding of the ways actual economies operated in places that had not adopted markets or government control as the primary approach to managing economic activity. Globalization, colonialism, and sustainability are among the economic trends that affect such contexts.

== Concepts ==
Indigenous economics is rooted in the beliefs, norms, and values of individual indigenous communities. Certain concepts often arise:

- Communal ownership and resource management: Resources such as land and water are often managed communally, with an emphasis on collective responsibility and stewardship.
- Sustainability and long-term planning: Indigenous economic systems typically prioritize sustainability and ecological balance. Economic decisions consider long-term impacts on the community and the environment.
- Reciprocity and redistribution: Economic interactions often involve principles of reciprocity and redistribution.
- Holistic Approach: Indigenous economics consider economy activity in the context of cultural, spiritual, social, and environmental concerns.

== See also ==
- Gift economy
- Indigenization – Form of cultural change
- Sustainable development – Mode of human development
- Indigenous rights – Legal, social, or ethical principles pertaining to indigenous peoples
