= Conservation of American bison =

Effort to increase bison in North America

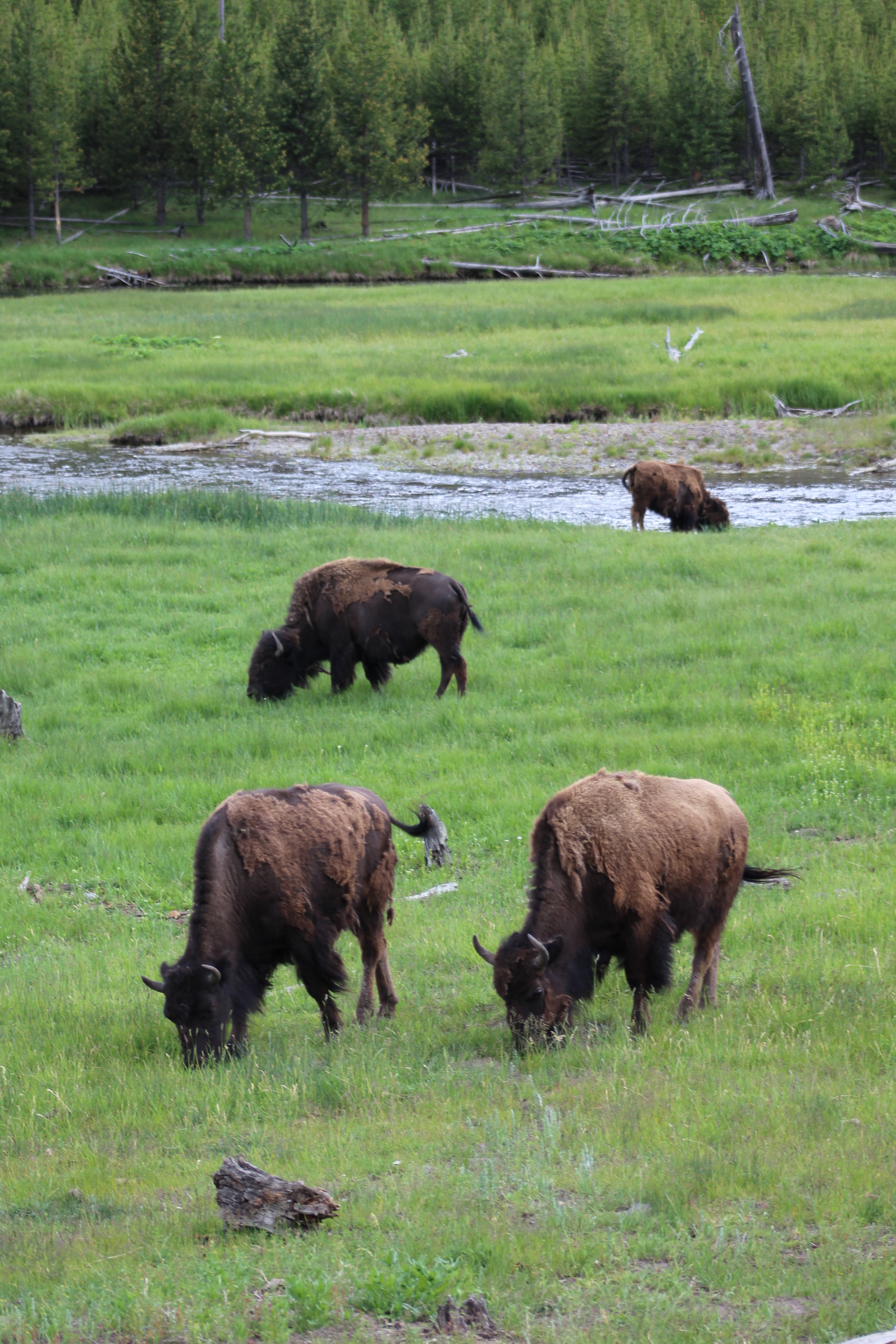
Bison grazing in Yellowstone

The conservation of bison in North America is an ongoing, diverse effort to bring American bison (Bison bison) back from the brink of extinction. Plains bison, a subspecies (Bison bison bison), are a keystone species in the North American Great Plains. Bison are a species of conservation concern in part because they suffered a severe population bottleneck at the end of the 19th century. The near extinction of the species during the 19th century unraveled fundamental ties between bison, grassland ecosystems, and indigenous peoples' cultures and livelihoods. English speakers used the word buffalo for this animal when they arrived. Bison was used as the scientific term to distinguish them from the true buffalo. Buffalo is commonly used as it continues to hold cultural significance, particularly for Indigenous people.

Recovery began in the late 19th century with a handful of individuals independently saving the last surviving bison and the government efforts to protect the remnant herd in Yellowstone National Park. Dedicated restoration efforts in the 20th century bolstered bison numbers though they still exist in mostly small and isolated populations. Expansion of the understanding of bison ecology and management is ongoing. The contemporary widespread, collaborative effort includes attention to heritage genetics and minimal cattle introgression.

== Context ==
Bison once roamed across most of North America in numbers that reached into the tens of millions. Before the 19th century, bison were a keystone species for the native shortgrass prairie habitat as their grazing pressure altered the food web and landscapes in ways that improve biodiversity. The expanses of grass sustained migrations of an estimated 30 to 60 million American bison which could be found across much of North America. While they ranged from the eastern seaboard states to southeast Washington, eastern Oregon, and northeastern California, the greatest numbers were found within the great bison belt on the shortgrass plains east of the Rocky Mountains that stretched from Alberta to Texas.

The grasslands once included more than 1,500 species of plants, 350 birds, 220 butterflies, and 90 mammals. The bison coexisted with elk, deer, pronghorn, swift fox, black-footed ferrets, black-tailed prairie dogs, white-tailed jackrabbits, bears, wolves, coyotes, and cougars. The bison scoring the trees with their horns kept them from taking over the open grasslands. As bison grazed, they dispersed seeds by excreting them. The heterogeneous or varied landscape created by the roaming bison helps birds of which millions arrive each year. Long-billed curlews are a migratory shorebirds that rely on three types of habitats on the prairie – areas with short grass, long grass and mud – for completing their breeding cycle each year. Mountain plovers use bison wallows as nesting sites. Prairie dogs benefited from the tendency of the bison to graze areas around prairie dog towns. The bison enjoyed the regrowth of plants previously cropped by the rodents which reduced the grass cover, making it easier to spot predators. Bald eagles, ravens, black-billed magpies, swift foxes, golden eagles, grizzly bears, wolves, beetles, and nematodes benefited from bison carcasses.

Such abundance made the bison a critical part of Native American culture for thousands of years: providing food as well as materials for clothing, shelter, tools, and more. In the 19th century, bison became the staple food for early explorers, fur traders, and many European settlers. With the introduction of the horse and the settling of European Americans in the west, a gradual decline of the bison population began. As conflict with settlers developed, the U.S. Army began a campaign to force Native American tribes on the lands allotted to them. Elimination of bison could further the government strategy of turning them into farmers. The country's highest generals, politicians, and President Ulysses S. Grant saw the taking away their main food source by the destruction of buffalo as the best way to accomplish their removal from the landscape. Hundreds of thousands of bison were killed by U.S. troops and market hunters. The transcontinental railroad was key in facilitating the large-scale hunting of bison along with the development of the repeating rifle. The rapid slaughter of bison also surged when a tanning method was developed that allowed the soft hide to be made into tougher, more desirable leather that was sent to an international market.

== Early efforts ==
In the late 1860s, private citizens independently began to capture and shelter bison. In 1874, both houses of Congress passed H.R. 921, To prevent the useless slaughter of buffaloes within the territories of the United States, but President Ulysses S. Grant did not sign it, resulting in a pocket veto. By the late 1880s, the great herds of bison that once dominated the landscape were nearly gone. The near decimation of the species unraveled fundamental ties between bison, grassland ecosystems, and Plains Indians' cultures and livelihoods. Bison were for all practical purposes ecologically extinct across its former range, with multiple consequences for grassland biodiversity. As they suffered a severe population bottleneck, bison became a species of conservation concern and various efforts to preserve the species through protection and stewardship began. As hunting ceased and private citizens provided grazing land, the ability of bison to increase their numbers was evident. As ranchers began to raise bison as livestock, they bred some of them with cattle. These bison–cattle hybridization experiments failed and were not repeated. Most of the bison available to establish conservation herds were from private herds resulting in cattle gene introgression being present in today's herds.

Oral accounts of the Confederated Salish and Kootenai tribes recall a man of the Pend d'Oreille tribe named Atatice who knew something needed to be done as the buffalo disappeared. Atatice's son Latati, or Little Peregrine Falcon, eventually led six orphan bison west to the Flathead Reservation. His stepfather, Samuel Walking Coyote, sold them to horse traders Michel Pablo and Charles Allard in 1884. The Pablo-Allard herd grew until 1896 when Allard died and his half of the herd was dispersed as it was sold to ranchers. Pablo's herd continued to grow and range wild along the Flathead River. By the early 1900s, the Pablo-Allard herd was said to be the largest collection of the bison remaining in the U.S. Pablo was notified in 1904 that the government was opening up the Flathead Reservation for settlement by selling off parcels of land. After failed negotiations with the U.S. government, Pablo sold the herd to the Canadian government in 1907. The transfer took until 1912, as the bison were captured and shipped by train from Ravalli, Montana, to Elk Island to establish a conservation herd.

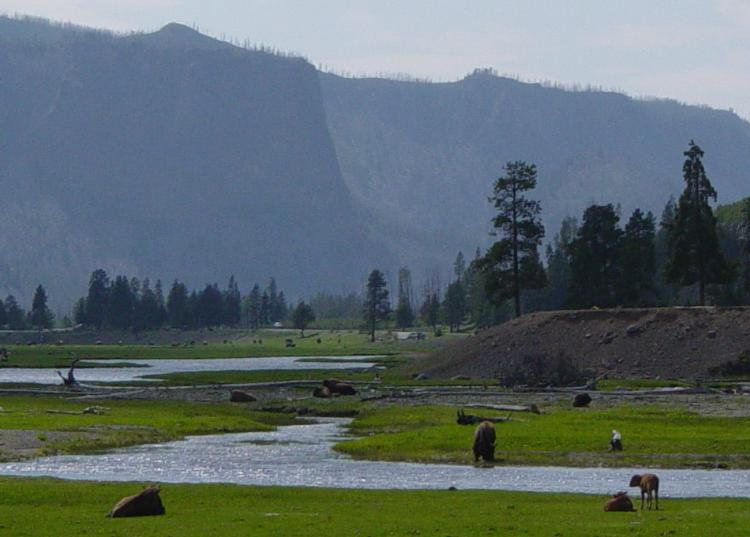
Bison grazing near Gibbon River at Madison in Yellowstone National Park

Yellowstone National Park was established on March 1, 1872, where poaching of bison continued despite the presence of the First U.S. Cavalry soldiers at Fort Yellowstone to, in part, protect wildlife. Bison dwindled to about two dozen animals that spent winter in Pelican Valley. In May 1894, Congress passed the Act to Protect the Birds and Animals in Yellowstone National Park, and to Punish Crimes in Said Park. Known as the Lacey Act of 1894, the law provided punishment for poaching on public lands, resolved jurisdictional issues and helped Yellowstone's managers to start recovering the bison population. In 1902, they purchased 21 bison from private owners and raised them in Mammoth and then at the Lamar Buffalo Ranch. This increased the genetic diversity of the Yellowstone bison herd but is also likely one of the sources of domestic cattle genes in the Yellowstone population.

Several bison first lived on the National Mall in a pen behind the Smithsonian Castle from 1888 until they were moved to the National Zoological Park that was established in 1891. Taxidermist William Temple Hornaday brought them back after he was sent out to collect bison specimens for the Smithsonian Museum in 1886. When he saw that bison were on the verge of extinction, his mission changed from hunting bison for display to preserving them in the wild. The American Bison Society (ABS) was formed in 1905 with Hornaday as its president to support bison recovery efforts. Theodore Roosevelt, named honorary president of the society, used his position as U.S. President to help the New York Zoological Society and the American Bison Society secure land, procure buffalo from ranchers and promote bison reintroduction projects. One of the first three bison restoration projects supported by Roosevelt and the ABS was the National Bison Range which returned some of the Allard herd to the Flathead Valley. The other two were the Wichita Mountains Reserve and Wind Cave National Park. On October 11, 1907, six bulls and nine cows were shipped by rail from the New York Zoological Park to the Wichita National Forest and Game Preserve in Oklahoma. Comanche Chief Quanah Parker came to the train station in Cache where the crates were transferred to horse-drawn wagons and hauled 13 miles (21 km) to the preserve. The children, waiting in the groups of Comanche families, had never seen a bison. In 1913, ABS sent 14 bison from the New York Zoological Gardens to Wind Cave National Park which had been created on January 3, 1903, by legislation signed by Roosevelt. An additional six bison were sent to the park in 1916 from Yellowstone National Park. Congress was also compelled to establish public bison herds at Sully's Hill National Game Preserve and Fort Niobrara National Wildlife Refuge.

The bison at Lamar Buffalo Ranch eventually began to mix with the free-roaming population in Yellowstone Park and by 1954, their numbers had grown to roughly 1,300 animals. Bison reproduce and survive at relatively high rates compared to many other large, wild mammals, so even as the population recovered Yellowstone managers limited its growth with frequent culling. A moratorium on culling, that began in 1969, resulted in the bison population increasing dramatically. Removals began again in 1991 and averaged 233 bison per year from 1991 through 2017 as wildlife officials tried to curb some of that rapid growth of 10 to 17 percent every year. Yearly guidelines were issued on how many bison should be removed. Many slaughtered bison have been provided to Native American Indian tribes, relief agencies and contract sales. Some live bison were shipped to zoos, reservations and other parks. Also in recent years hunting quotas have been increased in Montana and Wyoming for bison leaving Yellowstone Park.

== Contemporary approach ==
Preservation of the species' wild character is essential to bison conservation and is an important management strategy for conservation herds. This includes maintaining a mix of age and sex classes and allowing bison to interact naturally with the ecosystem. Conservation herds are in mostly small and isolated populations. Large herds on extensive landscapes where natural limiting factors are present with minimal human interaction are seen as the best method to achieve the full potential of bison. Natural selection occurs when bison are subject to natural pressures that affect their life histories such as predation, harsh environmental conditions, and competition for mates and food. The current strategy promotes having a minimum herd size of 1,000. Expansion of the understanding of bison ecology and management is ongoing.

A widespread, collaborative effort has led to the establishment of bison herds that include attention to heritage genetics and minimal cattle introgression. Tribal, federal, state, and non-governmental organizations conservation herds are managed with a focus on protecting wild bison and preserving their genetic diversity. Breeding efforts and genetic testing are used to develop herds that minimize genetic material that would have come from cross-breeding with cattle. Scientific studies show that most bison conservation herds possess some small amounts of cattle genes. While mitochondrial DNA can potentially influence the cellular physiology of bison, a large majority of heritable traits seen are coded by chromosomal DNA---the structure containing most of the DNA in an organism. The presence of both mitochondrial DNA and minimal levels of chromosomal DNA may have insignificant influence on the reproductive processes and phenotypic expression of a bison herd. Many of these herds with genetic diversity are considered valuable for the conservation of the species. Brucellosis was first identified in Yellowstone bison in 1917 having been identified in domestic cattle in the United States in 1910. Introduced by European cattle, it infected wild elk and bison. The potential spread of the disease is an impediment to the recovery efforts. Other impediments include the nomadic behavior of wild herds, and legal jurisdiction.

The development of conservation biology included the restoration of ecological processes with an emphasis on the impact upon the ecosystem beyond the importance of the bison at the level of an individual species. The grazing of bison is important to soil, vegetation and overall ecological balance. Prairie ecosystems were maintained by a pattern of disturbance caused by natural wildfire and grazing by bison, a pattern which is called pyric herbivory.

== US Department of the Interior Bison Conservation Initiative ==
The US Department of the Interior (DOI) is the principal conservation agency of the United States and is responsible for the majority of the nationally owned public lands as well as its natural and cultural resources. The DOI manages approximately one-third of North America's bison in conservation herds. The National Park Service (NPS), US Fish and Wildlife Service (USFWS), and Bureau of Land Management (BLM) lands support approximately 11,000 bison in 19 herds across 12 states. Together with the Bureau of Indian Affairs and the US Geological Survey, these DOI agencies promote bison conservation and shared stewardship. The 2008 issuance of the Bison Conservation Initiative (BCI) chartered the DOI Bison Working Groupon (BWG), an interagency group comprising representatives of the National Park Service, U.S. Fish and Wildlife Service, Bureau of Land Management, Bureau of Indian Affairs, and the U.S. Geological Survey. The Bison Conservation Initiative (BCI) was updated and adopted in May 2020. BWG, in conserving bison as wildlife, manages bison around principles and practices that maintain the wild character of bison, minimizes artificial selection, and allows forces of natural selection to operate, including competition for breeding. Using a metapopulation management strategy maintains genetic diversity and integrity through an interagency, science-based approach to restore gene flow across DOI bison conservation herds. The DOI works with conservation partners, states, tribes, nations, and non-governmental organizations (NGOs), to maintain large, wide-ranging, multi-jurisdictional bison herds on appropriate large landscapes.

Three free-ranging herds are managed by the National Park Service in the Grand Canyon, Grand Tetons, and Yellowstone National Parks. Yellowstone National Park is the only place in the United States where bison have lived continuously since prehistoric times. The Grand Tetons and Yellowstone herds have minimal cattle gene introgression but are not disease-free. The Grand Canyon herd is disease-free but has known cattle gene introgression.

Many of the conservation herds overseen directly by the Interior Department are small and spatially constrained with fences with only the slightest traces of cattle interbreeding. The herds that have 400 or fewer animals are prone to problems of inbreeding and genetic drift that reduce environmental adaptability due to limited transfers for interbreeding among distant herds according to a 2019 study commissioned by the National Park Service.

Bison herds grow at a rate that rapidly outpaces the available habitat on DOI bison management units. Capture is periodically required to manage herd size and provides opportunities to donate live bison in support of partner conservation and restoration efforts. Low-stress handling practices reduce animal stress and increase safety for both bison and personnel during capture operations, while increasing overall alignment with the goal to manage bison as wildlife. BWG manages diseases in bison that may affect domestic livestock or other bison herds. Wind Cave National Park introduced 20 bison in 1913–16 and is routinely culled down to approximately 425. Theodore Roosevelt National Park introduced 29 animals to a South Unit in 1956 and subsequently transferred 20 bison from that herd to the park's North Unit in 1962. They are routinely culled down to approximately 350 and 20 animals, respectively. Badlands National Park introduced 53 animals in 1963–64 and another 20 in 1984 and is routinely culled down to approximately 700.

== Greater Yellowstone Ecosystem ==
The management of the Yellowstone National Park herd shifted away from husbandry practices during the latter half of the 20th century to restoring wild behaviors and allowing bison to move freely within the park. Only a few bull bison traversed outside Yellowstone National Park prior to 1975, but as bison numbers increased, groups of bison began migrating across the north and west boundaries of Yellowstone to expand their winter range and pioneer new territory in the Greater Yellowstone Ecosystem. Park and state wildlife officials went to great lengths to prevent bison from mixing with cattle. Brucellosis is known to exist in the elk and bison of the Yellowstone ecosystem. State and federal officials were pressured to prevent the spread of the disease as ranchers worry it could lead to Montana losing its brucellosis-free status. Montana state law does not allow the transport of wild bison exposed to brucellosis except to meat processing and research facilities within the state. Some were captured and shipped to slaughter while others were shot by hunters or state agents. Montana managed a state-licensed hunt for bison that left the park from 1985 to 1991 but the number of bison migrating outside of the park continued to increase, prompting the National Park Service to develop management plans to control bison near the park boundaries. Intense controversy grew between environmentalists, livestock interests and agency managers.

During harsh winters, bison found convenient grazing on several U.S. Forest Service allotments that were used for cattle in the summer. In 1995, the Montana state legislature designated Yellowstone bison as a species in need of disease management and the state sued the National Park Service for allowing bison to leave the park. After five years of litigation and mediation, the state of Montana and the federal government developed the Interagency Bison Management Plan (IBMP) to guide the management of bison in and around Yellowstone. As part of this plan, five agencies and three tribal entities work to sustain a wild, wide-ranging bison population and reduce the risk of brucellosis transmission from bison to cattle. In the decades since the IBMP was created, the bison population has ranged between 2,400 and 5,500 animals. There have been no cases of bison transmitting brucellosis directly to cattle, in part due to efforts by federal and state agencies to maintain separation between these animals. The state of Montana now allows bison to occupy some habitat adjacent to the park that was previously off-limits, including year-round in some areas, which is a major conservation advancement. The lack of tolerance for wild bison in most areas outside Yellowstone continues to limit restoration. Large parts of their historic winter ranges are no longer available due to human development and states only allow limited numbers of bison in areas near the park. While hunting is not allowed within the park, it mainly occurs within an area outside the northern boundary near Gardiner as designated by the state. Removal numbers are decided each year, with tribal and state hunters being allowed a quota. Montana issues hunting permits and four tribes have long-standing treaty rights to hunt Yellowstone bison. Most of the bison are sent to slaughter with the meat being distributed to participating tribes. The IBMP plan includes allowing bison to enter the Bison Conservation Transfer Program as space allows.

== Bison Conservation Transfer Program ==
Yellowstone bison are exceptional because they comprise the nation's largest bison population on public land. Developing a quarantine program that complied with Montana state law was critical to getting brucellosis-free animals from Yellowstone to conservation herds. Quarantine was talked about in the 1990s during the negotiations on the IBMP. During 2005–2012, Animal and Plant Health Inspection Service (APHIS) developed and verified procedures for identifying Yellowstone bison that do not have brucellosis. Quarantine worked as bison that repeatedly tested negative for the disease stayed that way and could be certified as brucellosis-free. The initial plan was for the bison that completed the pilot program to be moved to public or tribal lands but the state was not ready to approve any of the proposed locations in 2010. Turner Enterprises Inc. cared for the bison and their offspring for five years on a 12,000-acre fenced section (4,900 ha) of the Flying D Ranch. Tribal and state officials signed an agreement in 2012 allowing the transfer of bison that were also in the 2005-2012 pilot study. Sixty-three animals from the Yellowstone quarantine corrals were transferred in March to the Assiniboine and Sioux Tribes who started a conservation herd at their Fort Peck Reservation. In October 2014, the animals were moved to the Fort Peck Reservation as the Fort Peck Fish and Game Department was recognized for having performed a good job of managing the bison including the disease testing. In November, 139 of the Yellowstone bison at the Flying D ranch joined the conservation herd at the Fort Peck Reservation.

Certification involves a multi-year process including holding animals in fenced pastures near the park boundary. The quarantine program approved by IBMP has three phases. First, bison are trapped at the Stephens Creek Bison Capture Facility where they are sorted by age and sex into different enclosed pens. A blood sample is also taken and they are tested for brucellosis with only about 30% of animals qualifying for the program. Bison that test negative can go into quarantine. Next, testing protocols continue until the animals can be certified as disease free. Finally, assurance testing involves another year in isolation with two more tests before the quarantine period is finished. The first two phases currently must be done in a supervised area in the vicinity of the park. APHIS and the Montana Department of Livestock established the final structural specifications and biosecurity requirements for quarantine facilities in June 2017. Two pens in a Yellowstone bison trap were made into quarantine corrals with two layers of fencing in 2017. The two facilities are located at Stephens Creek and Corwin Springs. Quarantine facilities are managed by APHIS who coordinates the transfers with the state of Montana and the Fort Peck tribes. The final phase of assurance testing can be performed at the Fort Peck Indian Reservation in northeastern Montana.

== Tribes and First Nations ==
Many tribes and First Nations seek to establish and manage their own bison herds, to rescue and sustain cultural practices and sacred rituals, promote food security, and nourish cultural identity. Ecocultural bison conservation concurrently pursues species conservation, restoration of ecological processes, and support of the traditional human use of natural resources. An ecocultural approach addresses the unique historical connection between bison and indigenous peoples, and the iconic status of bison for Canada and the United States. The InterTribal Buffalo Council (ITBC) advocates for tribal buffalo to restore them to communities and reservations in order to preserve the shared historical, cultural, traditional and spiritual relationship with the buffalo for future generations. The ITBC is a federally recognized tribal organization that delivers live bison to member tribes, supports establishment of tribal bison herds. Thousands of the animals culled from government-controlled herds have been donated to Native American tribes through tribal requests of parks or refuges or by way of the ITBC. The Bison Conservation Transfer Program has allowed some captured bison with Yellowstone heritage genetics that repeatedly test negative for brucellosis to provide disease-free bison to tribes and First Nations. In addition to supporting cultural restoration, the quarantine program can support genetic conservation of DOI herds by incorporating Yellowstone-origin bison into the DOI metapopulation. The program is a partnership that includes Yellowstone National Park, the Assiniboine and Sioux Tribes of the Fort Peck Indian Reservation, APHIS, Montana Department of Livestock, the State of Montana, InterTribal Buffalo Council, Yellowstone Forever, Defenders of Wildlife and the Greater Yellowstone Coalition.

The ITBC supported the construction of the quarantine facility at the Fort Peck Indian Reservation. They facilitate the transfer to tribes and First Nations who will use the bison to increase the genetic diversity and overall health of their own herds. The recipients must be members of ITBC and agree to have the animals managed for their genetics.

Under the new operational quarantine program, the first transfer into phase three at the Fort Peck Indian Reservation occurred in August 2019. The Assiniboine and Sioux Tribes would complete the quarantine program for 55 male bison who had been captured at Stephens Creek in the northwest corner of park in March 2018. Three males and 21 females captured at the same time remained in quarantine in corrals at Corwin Springs, just outside the park's North Entrance. By June 2020, 104 bison had been transferred to large corral specifically built for quarantining Yellowstone bison at the reservation. In August 2020, 40 buffalo, who had completed quarantine at the reservation, were distributed to 16 other tribes across the United States including Kansas, Wisconsin and Alaska. Since 2019, 294 bison have been transferred to the Fort Peck Tribes in northeastern Montana. Two family groups were transferred for the first time in December 2021.

The Meskwaki Settlement in Iowa has raised a herd of approximately twenty bison on the community's southern edge.

In June 2023 25 bison were transferred from Elk Island park in Canada to the Blackfeet confederacy of Montana, they were released into the Chief Mountain Wilderness, they are the first free roaming bison herd on tribal land since the near extinction of the species in the 1800s.

As it is mentioned in contemporary approach bison are legally managed as livestock. This allows for bison to be easily transported and managed by tribal entities for tribes to have greater control of the bison, allowing them to harvest and breed them freely for ceremonial or food purposes. If bison were to be legally classified as wildlife there would be some tradeoffs. The classification of bison as wildlife would primarily impact the legal framework governing their movement, sale, and management. Under such a designation, bison would be subject to public ownership, making it very difficult for private individuals, such as ranchers, to buy, sell, or transport them. Tribal agencies would retain the ability to move bison; however, doing so would require permits and could face additional challenges, particularly when crossing state lines. This classification would also likely increase efforts and legal routes to introducing bison in a free roaming setting on public lands. If this were to happen many tribes would have reserved treaty rights to practice such hunting. Several tribes in the states around Yellowstone, where free roaming populations would most likely be introduced, have these rights including the Crow, Confederated Salish and Kootenai Tribes (CSKT), Blackfeet, Shoshone-Bannock, and Nez Perce, hold reserved hunting and fishing rights on and off reservation lands. These rights have been increasingly affirmed through legal victories. Five tribes retain treaty hunting rights in the Yellowstone area that allow them to regulate their own hunts for bison that regularly leave the park.

== Province and state programs ==
The Minnesota Bison Conservation Herd is a project of the Minnesota Department of Natural Resources (MDNR) to raise and manage a herd of bison with the healthiest genetics possible. The Minnesota Zoological Garden (MZG) manages the metapopulation with the MDNR using a strategy that maintains genetic diversity among the approximately 130 bison at four different locations: Blue Mounds State Park, Minneopa State Park, the Minnesota Zoo and Zollman Zoo. An ultimate herd size of 500 has been set to ensure the long-term sustainability of bison in Minnesota. Three free-ranging herds are managed by state wildlife agencies in Utah and Alaska. Montana Fish, Wildlife and Parks began researching re-establishing wild populations in 2010. The plan, which laid the groundwork for wild bison reintroduction without specifying any particular site or plan for a herd, was published in January 2020. The plan was ended under a settlement in a lawsuit by United Property Owners of Montana in 2021.

== Protected areas with bison herds ==
Bison occupy less than one percent of their historical range with fewer than 20,000 bison in conservation herds on public, tribal or private protected lands. The roughly 500,000 animals that are raised for commercial purposes are not included unless the entity is engaged in conservation efforts.

== See also ==
- History of bison conservation in Canada
- Buffalo Commons
- Buffalo Treaty
