= Leroy Little Bear =

Blackfoot researcher and professor emeritus

Leroy Little Bear is a Blackfoot researcher, professor emeritus at the University of Lethbridge, founding member of Canada's first Native American Studies Department, and recognized leader and advocate for First Nations education, rights, self-governance, language and culture. He has received numerous awards and recognition for his work, including the Officer Order of Canada, and the Alberta Order of Excellence.

== Personal life ==
Little Bear was born and raised on the Kainai First Nation in Alberta, Canada. Little Bear was one of seven children. He attended the on-reserve residential school.

He was one of the first First Nations people to graduate from the University of Lethbridge, completing a Bachelor of Arts Degree in 1971. He went on to complete a Juris Doctor Degree at the College of Law, University of Utah in 1975.

== Career ==
Little Bear was a founding member of the Native American Studies Department at the University of Lethbridge. He was chair of the department for 21 years. He went on to be the founding director of the Native American Program at Harvard University. Little Bear retired from the University of Lethbridge in 1997, but continues to be active in numerous areas.

An active researcher and writer, Little Bear has written numerous articles and books on topics such as self-governance, and the relationship between the Canadian federal government and First Nations.

With expertise and training in law, Little Bear has made significant contributions in areas of First Nations constitutional rights, justice and self-determination. He played a significant role in Canada's constitutional changes. He advised the National Indian Brotherhood on the transfer of Canada's founding legislation, the British North America Act, from British to Canadian authority. He continued to act as legal advisor. Little Bear has offered strategic planning and consulting for Treaties 6, 7 and 8. Little Bear was a member of the legal team working to negotiate the Constitution of Canada's Section 35 from 1981–1987. Section 35 recognizes and enshrines Indigenous rights. Little Bear became the first Indigenous person cited in the Supreme Court of Canada with his 1977 paper, A Native Concept of Title. He wrote the Kainaisini, the constitutional framework for Blood Tribe governance, in 1984, and the Blood Tribe Police Commission in 1985. He drafted the declaration for formally re-establishing the Blackfoot Confederacy in 2000.

Little Bear advocates for supporting Indigenous worldviews in education, especially through language. He sees understanding worldviews as key to the work of truth and reconciliation in Canada. He stated: "The best way of changing ways of thinking is to change ways of thought ... Changing the language and thinking in a new language is the best way to accomplish this notion of renewal."

Little Bear is a member of the Indigenous Wisdom Advisory Panel, a panel sponsored by the Alberta government and works to bring Indigenous perspectives to environmental monitoring. For example, identifying and examining the impacts of the oil and gas industry on the land from an Indigenous worldview, as well as a scientific perspective.

== Activism ==
Little Bear has contributed to Indigenous activism on both international and national levels. He worked with the United Nations to help establish a working group on Indigenous populations. This working group originated the concept and created the initial draft of the United Nations Declaration on the Rights of Indigenous Peoples (UNDRIP). Little Bear also contributed several publications on criminal justice issues, land and aboriginal title, and fishing rights to the Royal Commission on Aboriginal Peoples.

Little Bear has played an integral role in recognizing the buffalo's cultural impact on First Nations across North America. He co-instigated and authored the Buffalo Treaty, a treaty between 13 North American First Nations to re-introduce the buffalo back to their respective lands. He is also the founder and President of the International Buffalo Relations Institute.

== Awards and recognition ==
- Little Bear holds honorary doctorates from the University of Northern British Columbia and the University of Lethbridge.
- He holds the keys to the city of Lethbridge.
- The University of Lethbridge Distinguished Alumnus of the Year Award (2003)
- National Aboriginal Achievement Award for Education (2003)

== Selected writing ==
- Little Bear, Leroy; Boldt, Menno; Long, J. Anthony (1988). Governments in conflict?: provinces and Indian nations in Canada. Toronto: University of Toronto. ISBN 978-0-8020-5779-2.
- Little Bear, Leroy (1992). Pathways to self-determination: Canadian Indians and the Canadian state. Toronto: Univ. of Toronto Press. ISBN 978-0-8020-2524-1.
- Little Bear, Leroy (2012). "Traditional Knowledge and Humanities: A Perspective by a Blackfoot". Journal of Chinese Philosophy. 39 (4): 518–527. doi:10.1111/j.1540-6253.2012.01742.x.
- Little Bear, Leroy (1994). The relationship of aboriginal people to the land and the aboriginal perspective on aboriginal title. Ottawa, Ont.: publisher not identified.
- Little Bear, Leroy (2009). Naturalizing indigenous knowledge: synthesis paper. Saskatoon, Sask.: Canadian Council on Learning. Aboriginal Learning Knowledge Centre.
- Little Bear, Leroy (2004). "Aboriginal Paradigms: Implications for Relationships to Land and Treaty Making". In Kerry Wilkins (ed.). Advancing Aboriginal Claims: Visions, Strategies, Directions. pp. 26–38. ISBN 1895830249.
- Little Bear, Leroy (2013). "An Elder Explains Indigenous Philosophy and Indigenous Sovereignty". Philosophy and Aboriginal Rights: Critical Dialogues: 6–18.
