= Prairie =

Ecosystems considered part of the temperate grasslands, savannas, and shrublands biome

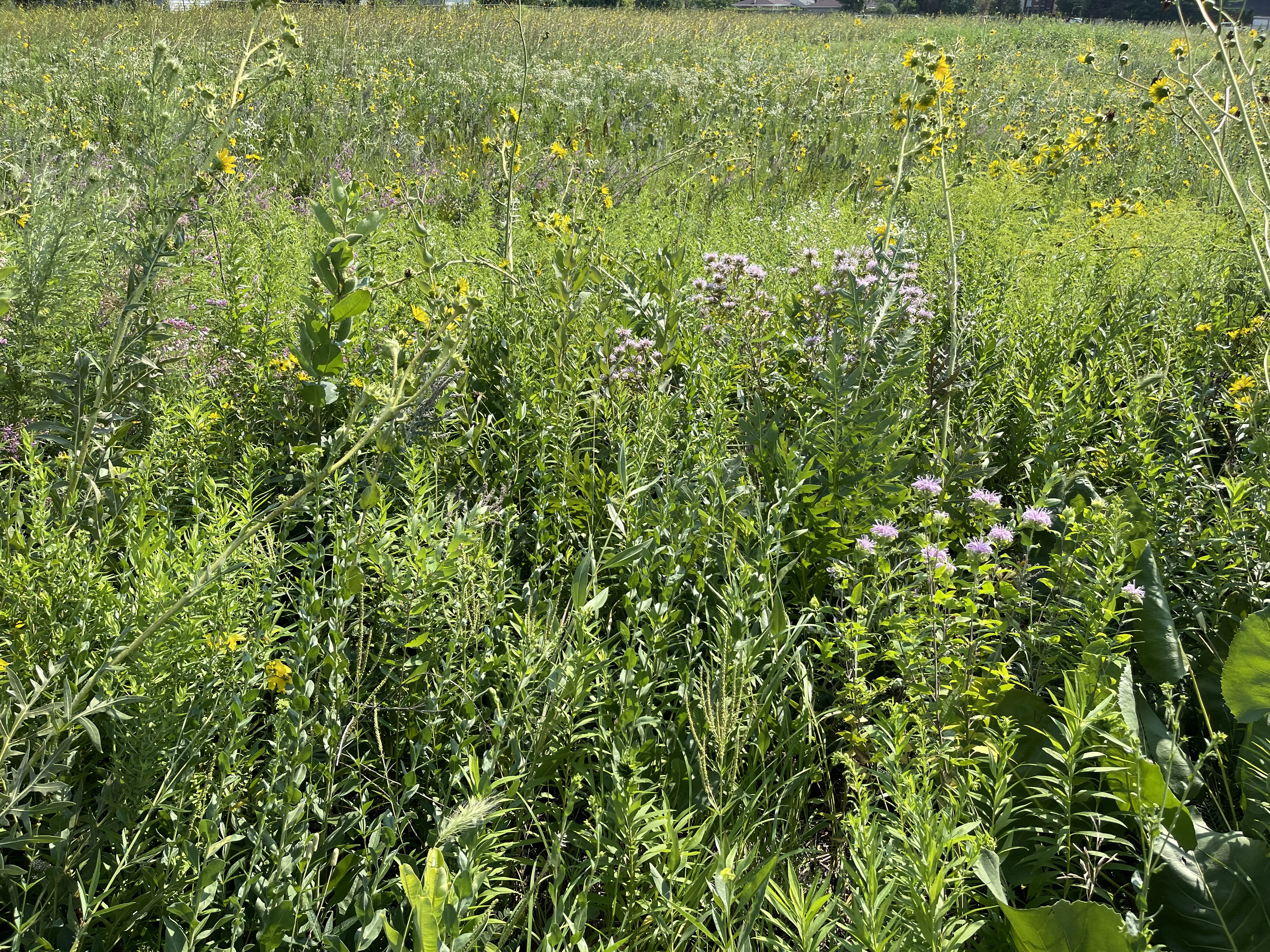
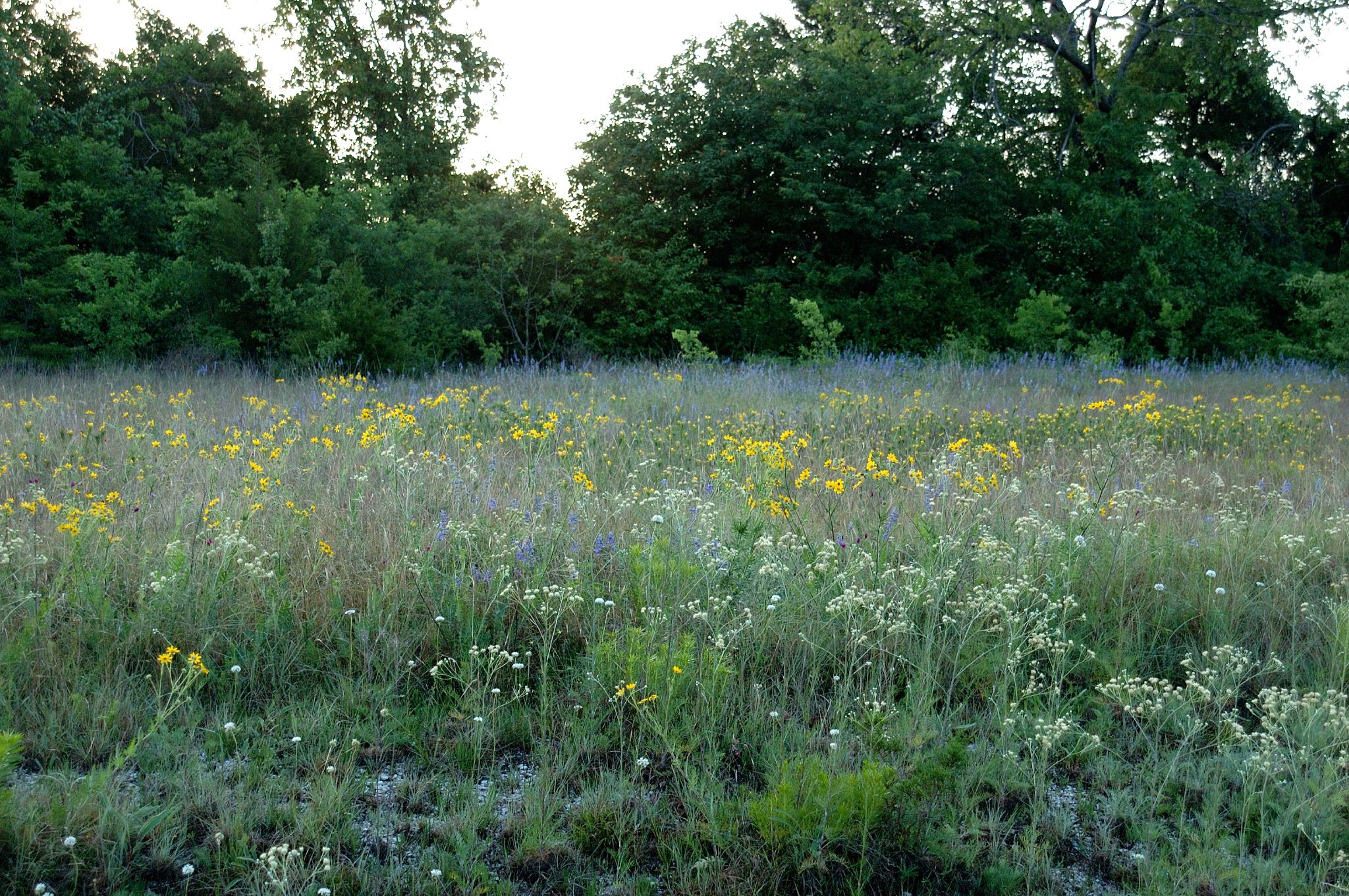
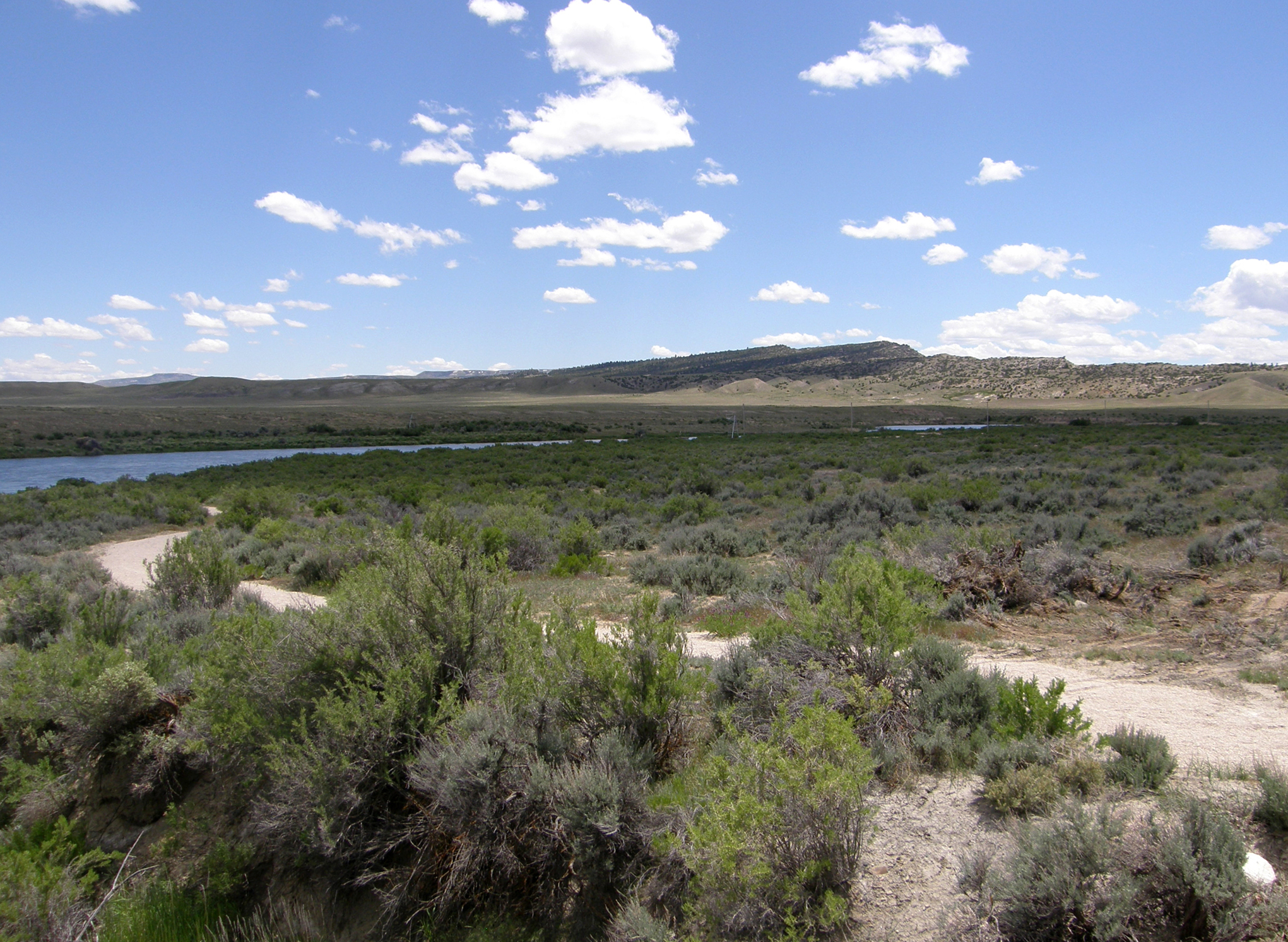
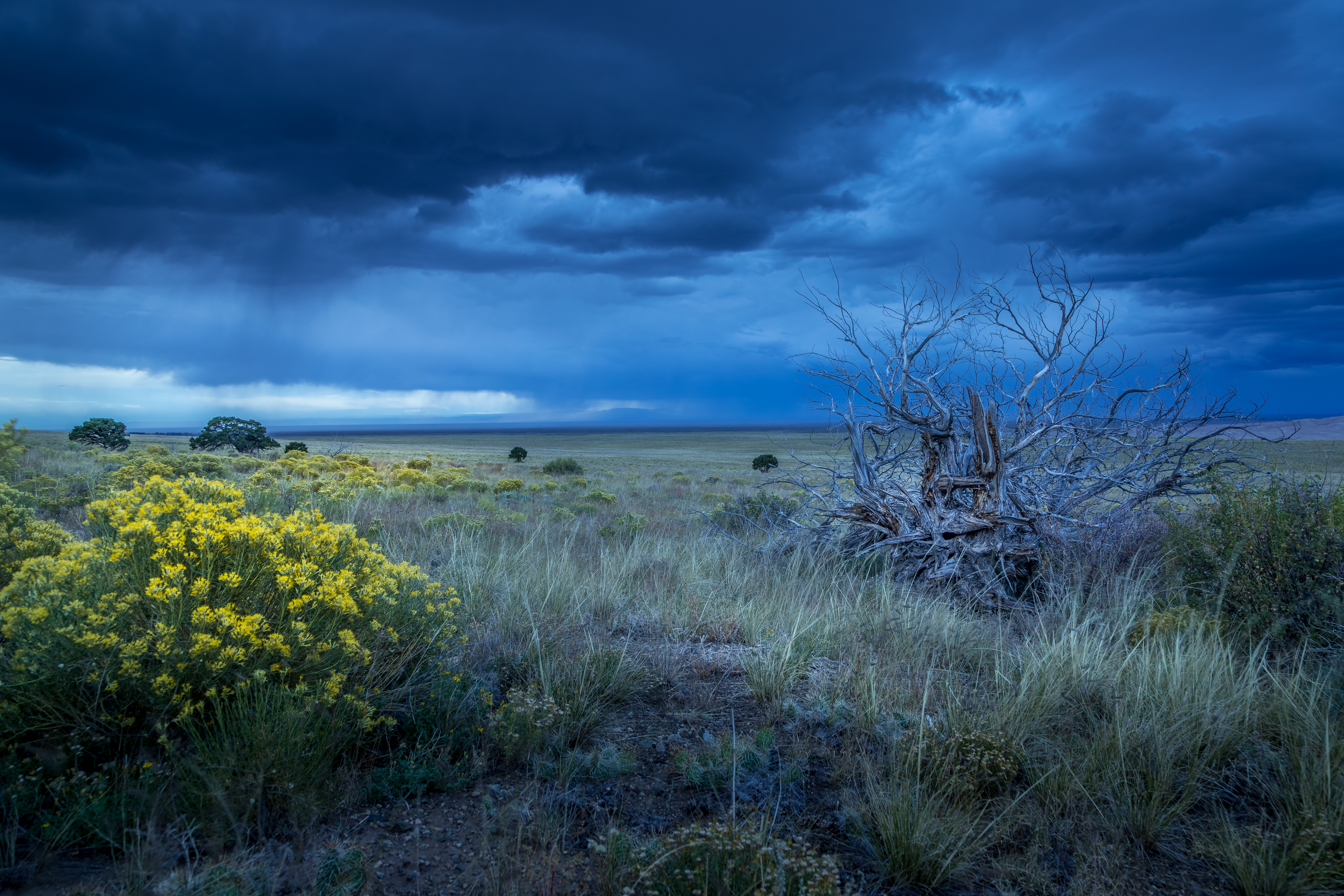
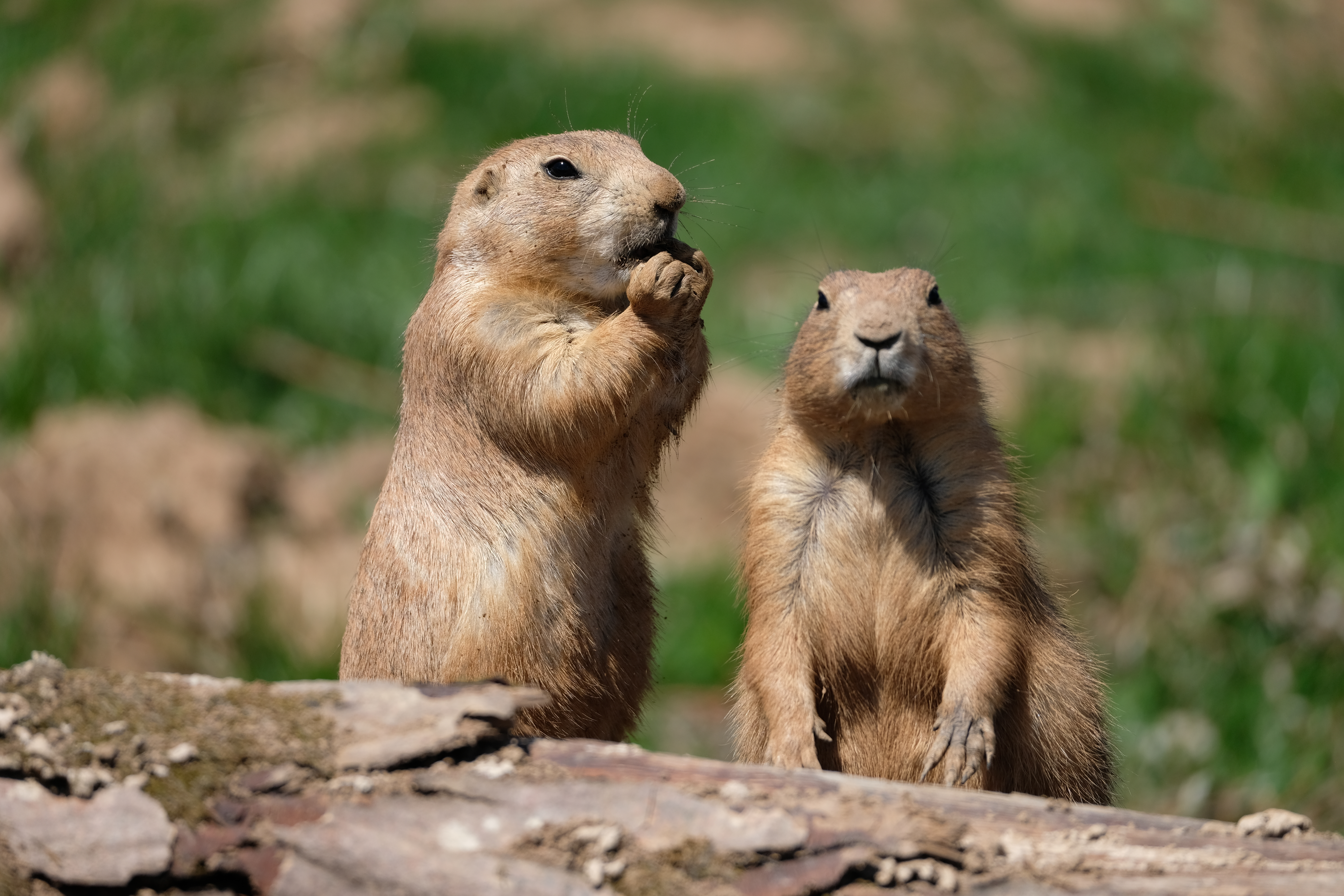
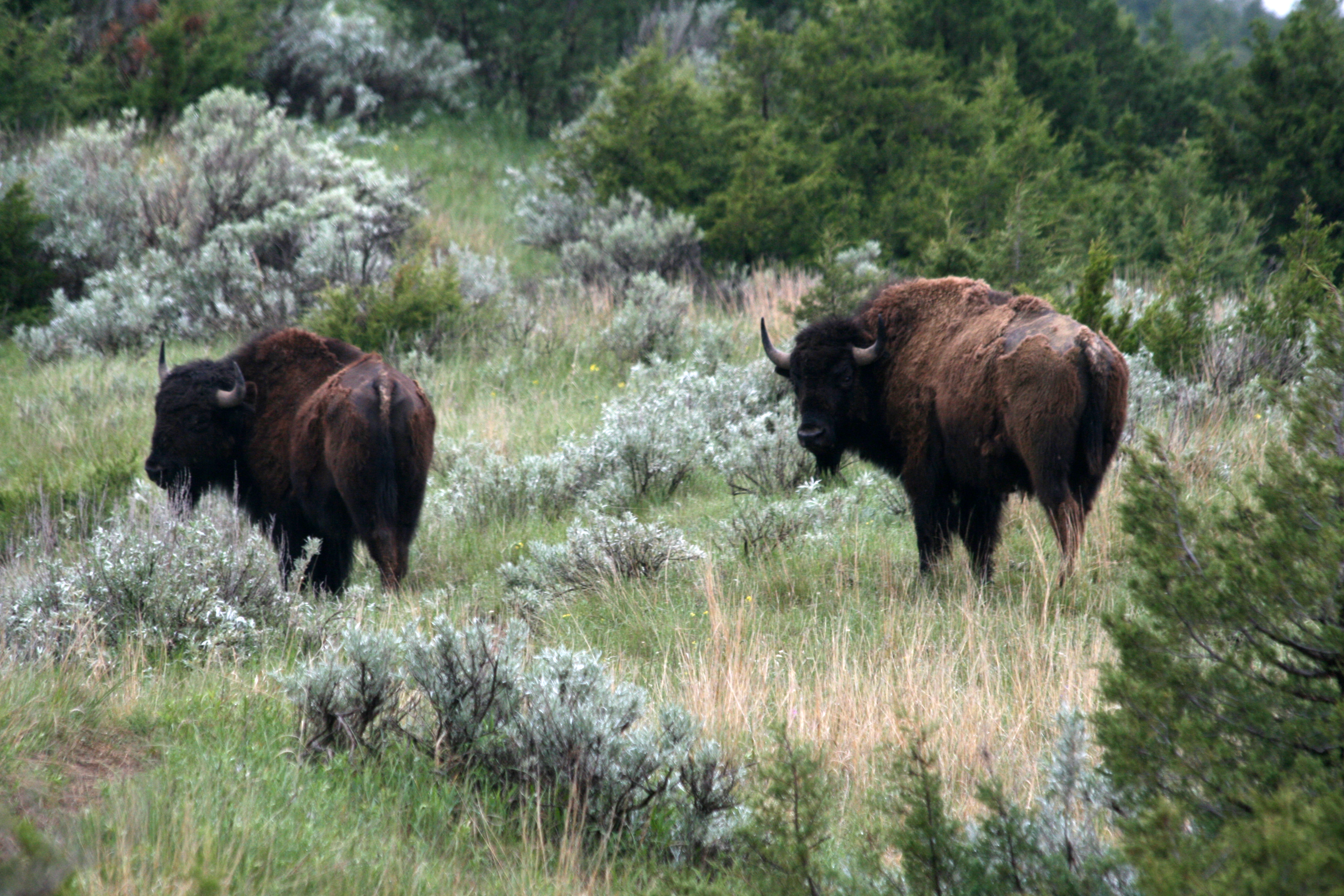
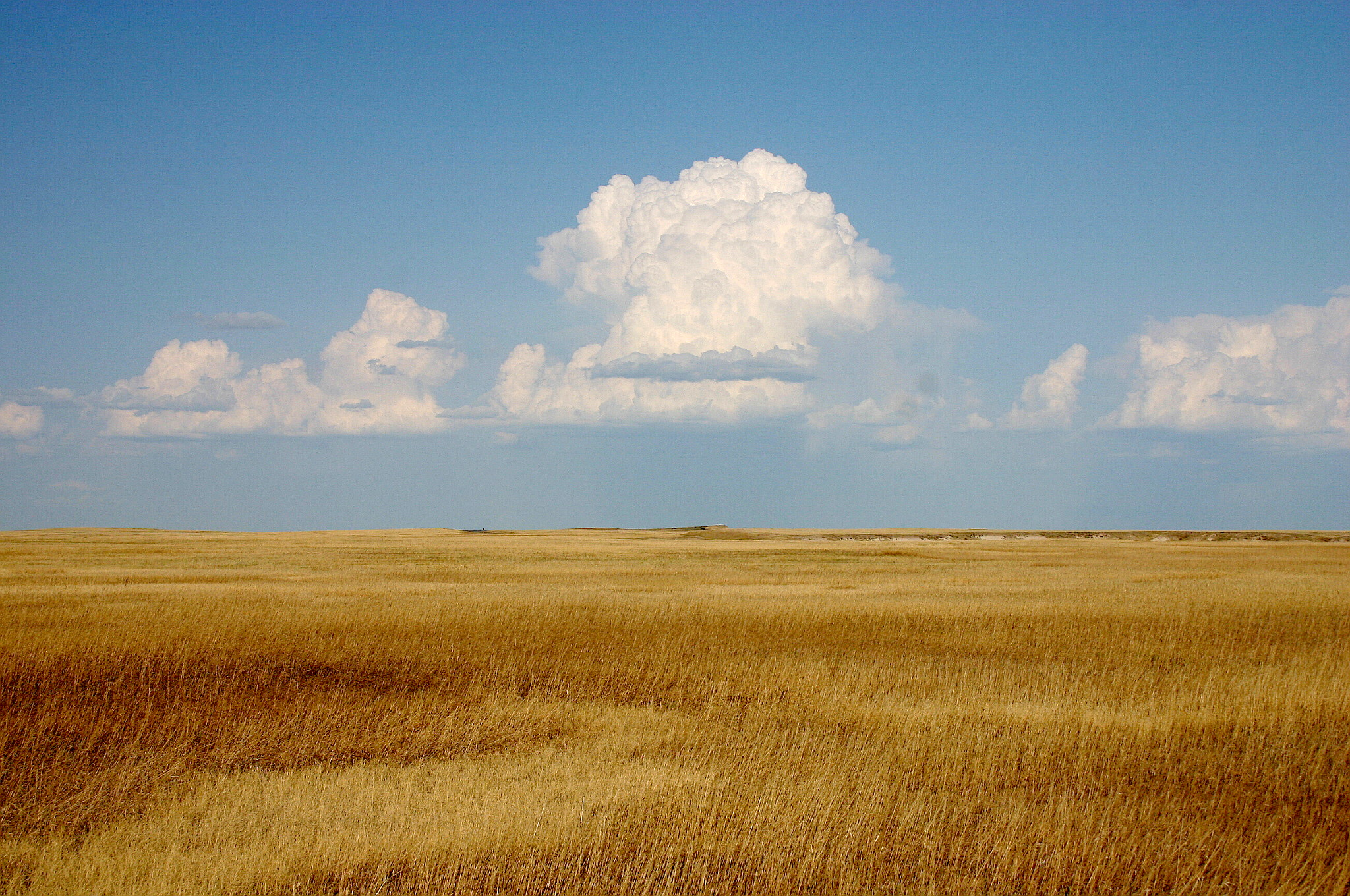
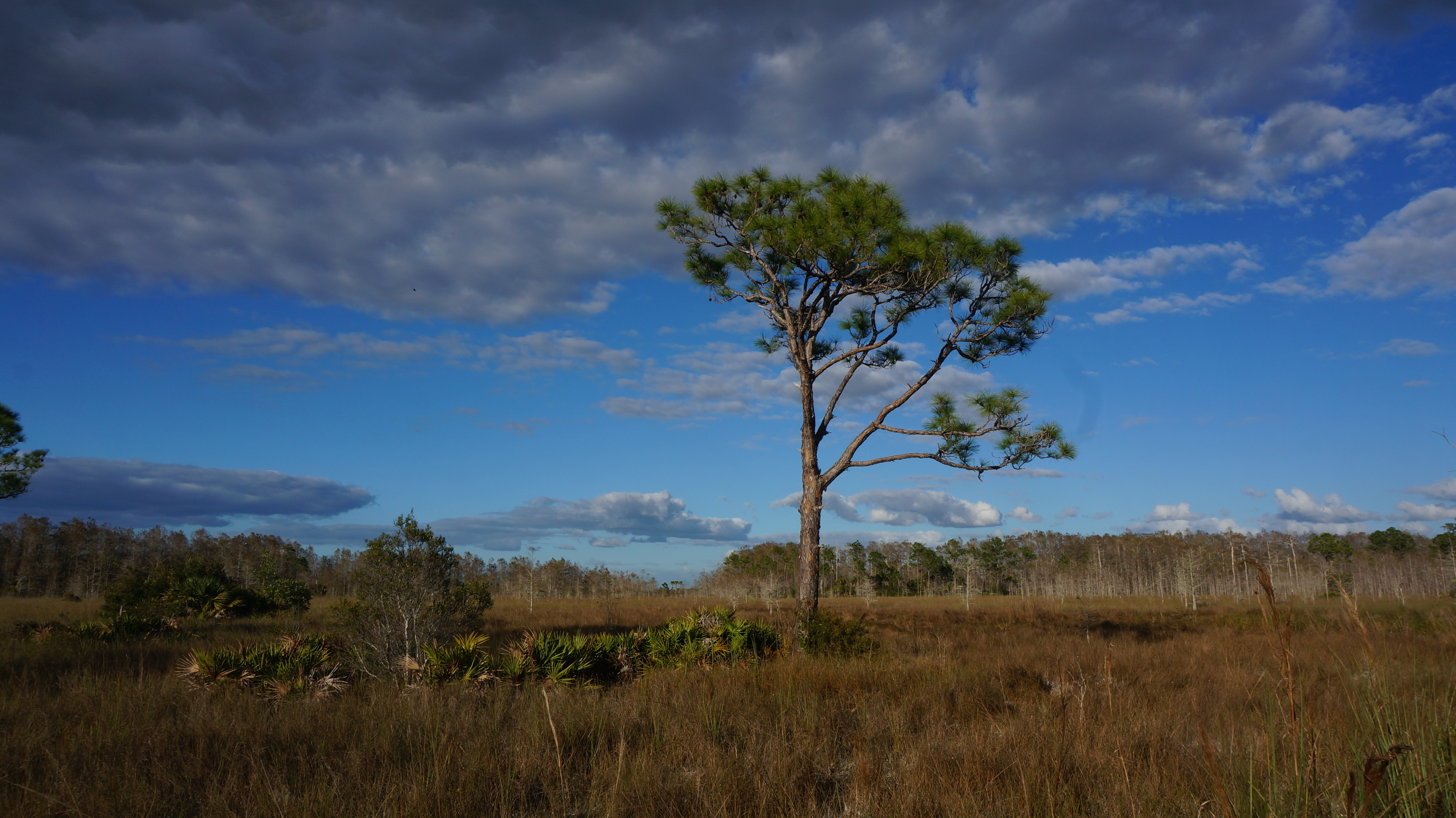
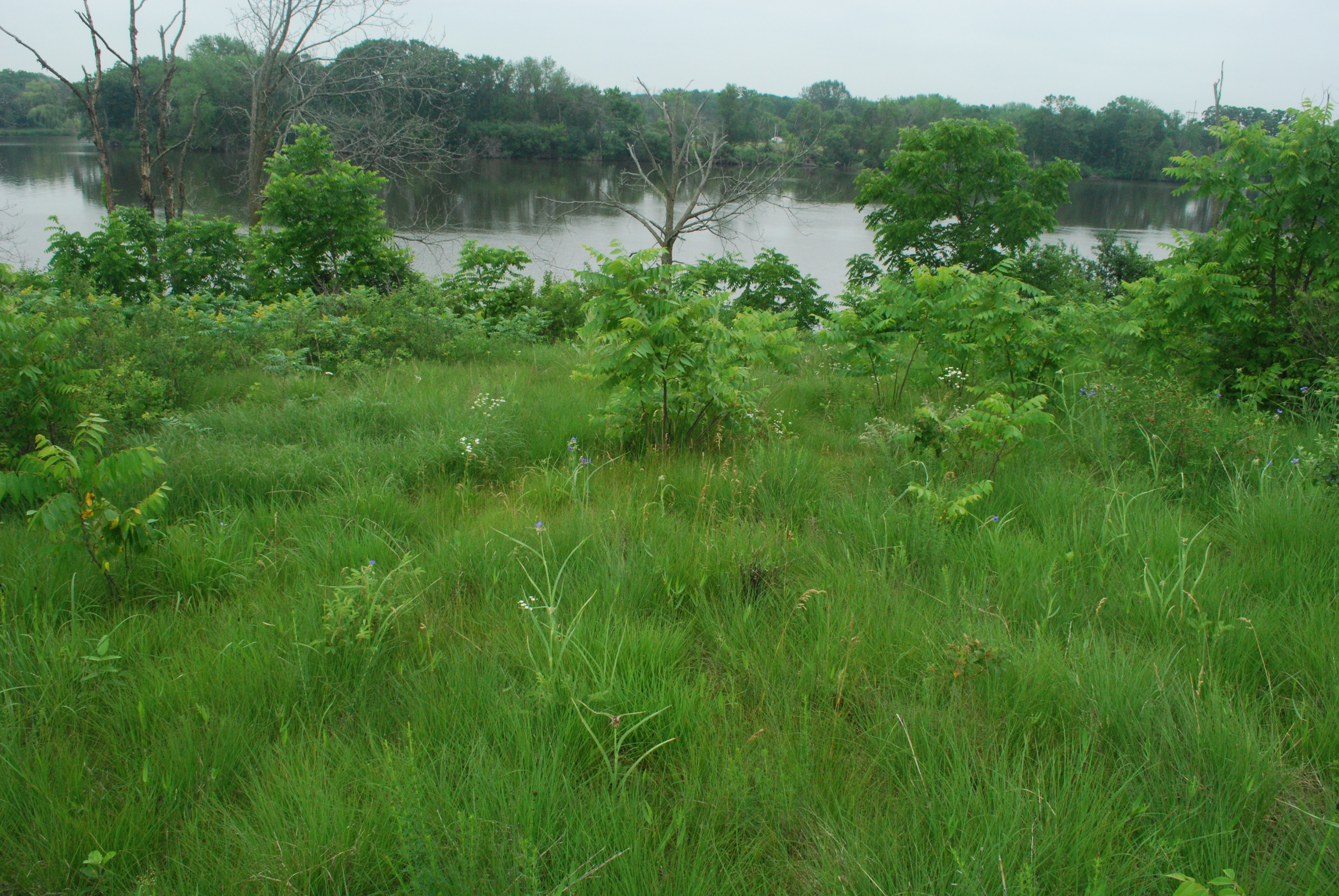
Collage of prairies in different environments

Prairies are ecosystems considered part of the temperate grasslands, savannas, and shrublands biome by ecologists, based on similar temperate climates, moderate rainfall, and a composition of grasses, herbs, and shrubs, rather than trees, as the dominant vegetation type. Temperate grassland regions include the Pampas of Argentina, Brazil, and Uruguay, and the steppe of Romania, Ukraine, Russia, and Kazakhstan. Lands typically referred to as "prairie" (a French loan word) tend to be in North America. The term encompasses the lower and mid-latitude of the area referred to as the Interior Plains of Canada, the United States, and Mexico. It includes all of the Great Plains as well as the wetter, hillier land to the east. From west to east, generally the drier expanse of shortgrass prairie gives way to mixed grass prairie and ultimately the richer and wetter soils of the tallgrass prairie.

In the U.S., the area is constituted by most or all of the states, from north to south, of North Dakota, South Dakota, Nebraska, Kansas, and Oklahoma, and sizable parts of the states of Montana, Wyoming, Colorado, New Mexico, Texas in the west, and to the east, Minnesota, Wisconsin, Iowa, Missouri, Illinois, and Indiana. The Palouse of Washington and the Central Valley of California are also prairies. The Canadian Prairies occupy vast areas of Manitoba, Saskatchewan, and Alberta. Prairies may contain various lush flora and fauna, often contain rich soil maintained by biodiversity, with a temperate climate and a varied view.

== Etymology ==
Approximate regional types of prairie in the United States Shortgrass prairie Mixed grass prairie Tallgrass prairie

According to Theodore Roosevelt:

We have taken into our language the word prairie, because when our backwoodsmen first reached the land [in the Midwest] and saw the great natural meadows of long grass—sights unknown to the gloomy forests wherein they had always dwelt—they knew not what to call them, and borrowed the term already in use among the French inhabitants.

Prairie (pronounced [pʁɛʁi]) is the French word for "meadow", formed ultimately from the Latin root word pratum (which has the same meaning).

== Formation ==
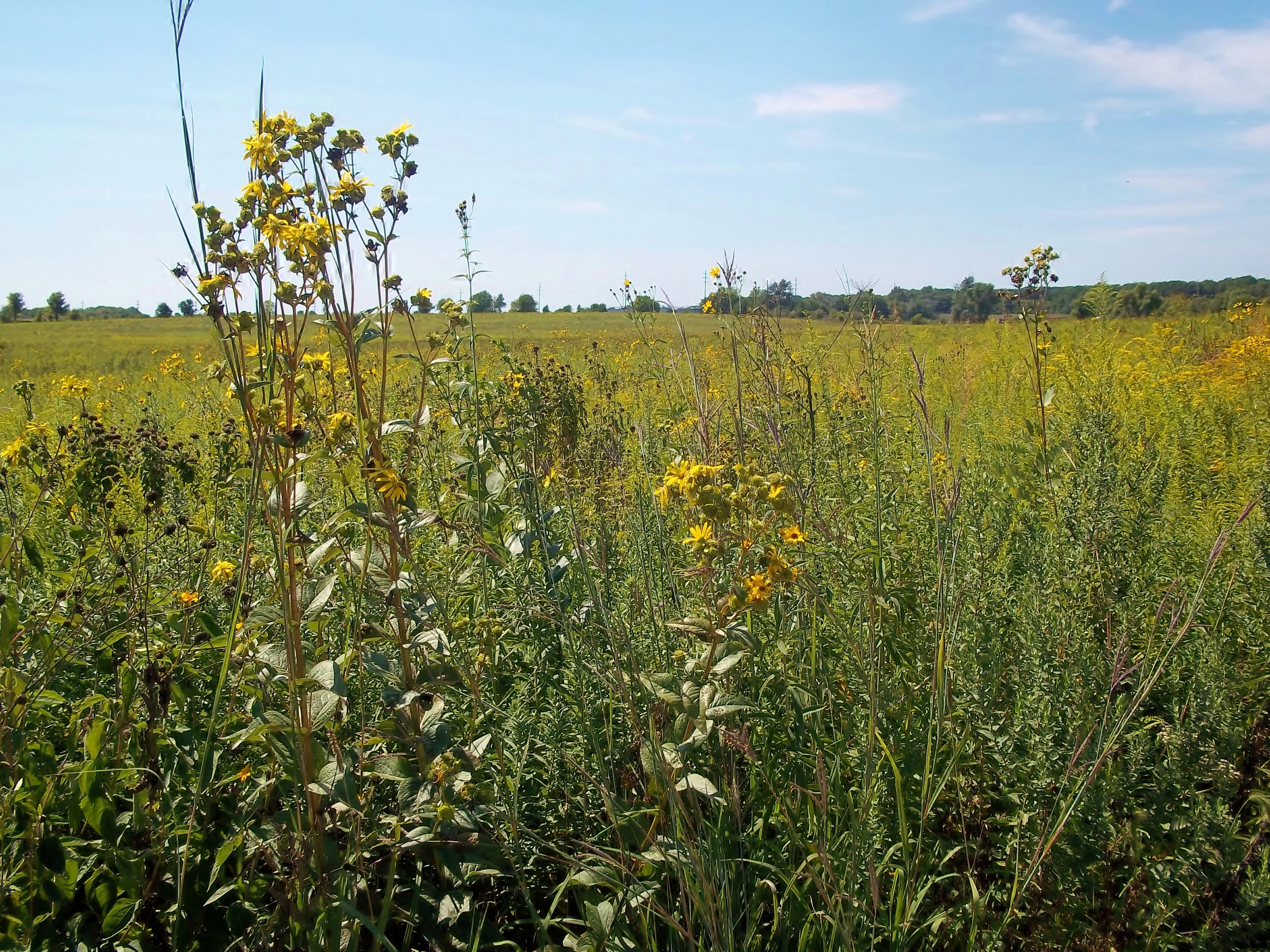
Tallgrass prairie flora (Midewin National Tallgrass Prairie)

The formation of the Canadian Prairies started with the uplift of the Rocky Mountains near Alberta. The mountains created a rain shadow which resulted in lower precipitation rates downwind.

The parent material of most prairie soil was distributed during the last glacial advance that began about 110,000 years ago. The glaciers expanding southward scraped the landscape, picking up geologic material and leveling the terrain. As the glaciers retreated about 10,000 years ago, they deposited this material in the form of till. Wind-based loess deposits also form an important parent material for prairie soils.

Tallgrass prairie evolved over tens of thousands of years with the disturbances of grazing and fire. Native ungulates such as bison, elk, and white-tailed deer roamed the expansive, diverse grasslands before European colonization of the Americas. For 10,000-20,000 years, native people used fire annually as a tool to assist in hunting, transportation, and safety. Evidence of ignition sources of fire in the tall grass prairie are overwhelmingly human as opposed to lightning. Humans, and grazing animals, were active participants in the process of prairie formation and the establishment of the diversity of graminoid and forbs species. Fire has the effect on prairies of removing trees, clearing dead plant matter, and changing the availability of certain nutrients in the soil from the ash produced. Fire kills the vascular tissue of trees, but not prairie species, as up to 75% (depending on the species) of the total plant biomass is below the soil surface and will re-grow from its deep (upwards of 20 feet) roots. Without disturbance, trees will encroach on a grassland and cast shade, which suppresses the understory. Prairie and widely spaced oak trees evolved to coexist in the oak savanna ecosystem.

== Ecology ==
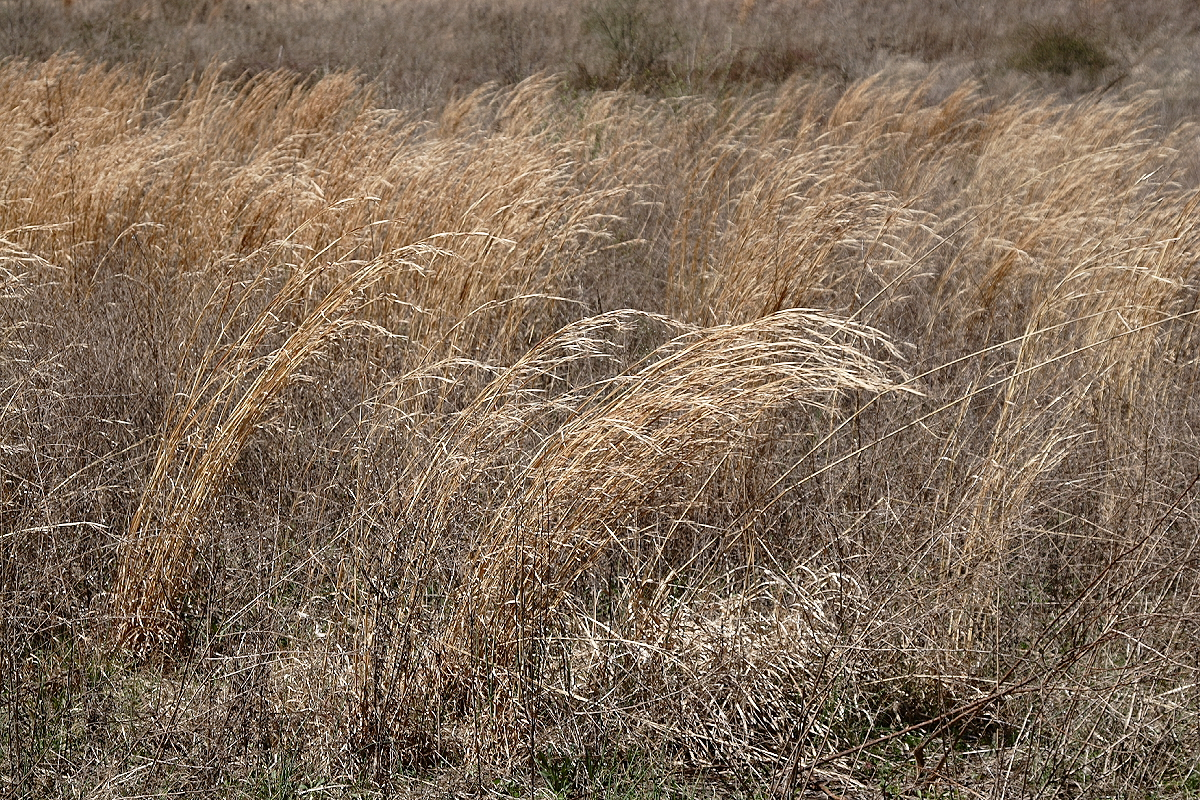
Prairie grasses

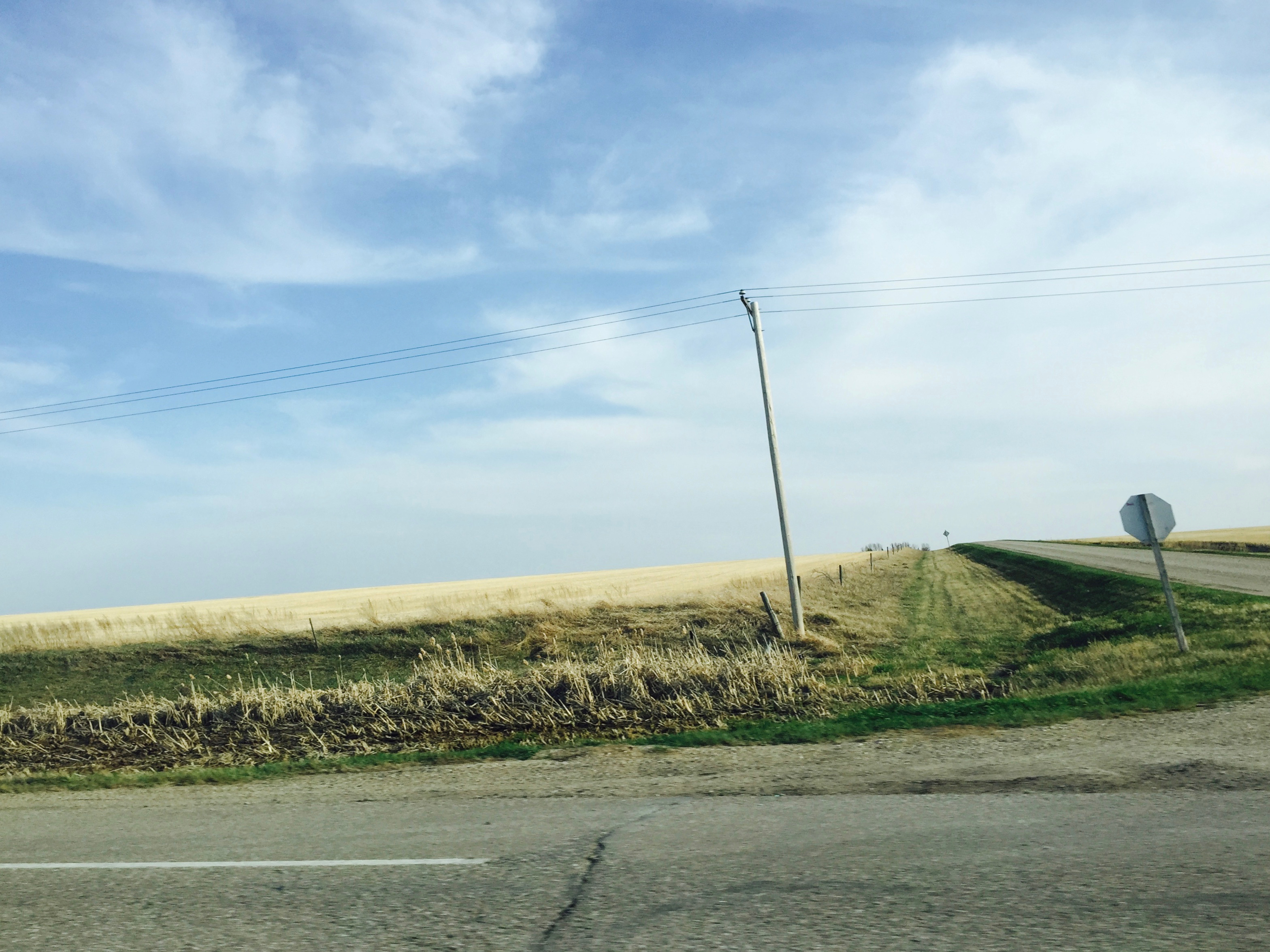
Wheatfield intersection in the Southern Saskatchewan prairies, Canada

Prairie ecosystems in the United States and Canada are divided into the easternmost tallgrass prairie, the westernmost shortgrass prairie, and the central mixed-grass prairie. Tallgrass prairies receive over 30 inches of rainfall per year, whereas shortgrass prairies are much more arid, receiving only 12 inches or so, and mixed-grass prairies receive intermediate rainfall. Wet, mesic, and dry prairie ecosystems can also form more locally due to soil and terrain characteristics. Wet prairies may form in low-lying areas with poor drainage; dry prairie can be found on uplands or slopes. Dry prairie is the dominant habitat type in the Southern Canadian agricultural and climatic region which is known as Palliser's Triangle. It was once thought to be completely unarable, but is now one of the most important agricultural regions in Canada thanks to advances in irrigation technology.

=== Biodiversity ===
The dominant plant life in prairies consists of grasses, which may include 40 to 60 different grass species. In addition to grasses, prairies can include over 300 species of flowering plants. The Konza Tallgrass Prairie in Kansas hosts 250 species of native plants and provides habitat for 208 birds, 27 mammals, 25 reptiles, and over 3,000 insects.

Some of the dominant grasses of prairies are Indian grass, big bluestem, side-oats grama, Canada wildrye, and switchgrass.

Prairies are considered to be fire-dependent ecosystems. Regular controlled burning by Native Americans, practices developed through observation of non-anthropogenic fire and its effects, maintained the biodiversity of the prairie, clearing away dead vegetation and preventing trees from shading out the diverse grasses and herbaceous plants. Prairies also depend on the presence of large grazing animals, particularly bison.

Bison are important to the prairie ecosystem because they shape and alter the environment by grazing, trampling areas with their hooves, wallowing, and depositing manure. Bison eat more grass than flowering plants, increasing the diversity of plants in the prairie. Cattle are thought to prefer to eat flowering plants over grasses, but it is not known if that is because of inherent differences in the species or because farmed cattle tend to be confined in smaller areas. Bison dung is a vital source of nutrients for prairie soil, spreads seeds, and supports over 1,000 insect species, including specialist dung beetles which cannot subsist on the feces of any other animal.

=== Degradation ===
In spite of long recurrent droughts and occasional torrential rains, the grasslands of the Great Plains were not subject to great soil erosion. The root systems of native prairie grasses firmly held the soil in place to prevent run-off of soil. When the plant died, the fungi and bacteria returned its nutrients to the soil. These deep roots also helped native prairie plants reach water in even the driest conditions. Native grasses suffer much less damage from dry conditions than many farm crops currently grown. When the eastern tallgrass prairies were plowed and turned into agricultural lands, the prairie grasses with their strong root systems were destroyed. In combination with severe droughts that resulted in the Dust Bowl, a major ecological disaster in which winds picked up the dry, unprotected prairie soil and formed it into "black blizzards" of airborne dirt that blackened the skies for days at a time across 19 states and forced 400,000 people to abandon the Great Plains ecoregion. The Dust Bowl was a major reason for the Great Depression.

== Human use ==
=== Bison hunting ===
Nomadic hunting has been the main human activity on the prairies for the majority of the archaeological record. This once included many now-extinct species of megafauna.

After the other extinctions, the main hunted animal on the prairies was the plains bison. Using loud noises and waving large signals, Native peoples would drive bison into fenced pens called buffalo pounds to be killed with bows and arrows or spears, or drive them off a cliff (called a buffalo jump), to kill or injure the bison en masse. The introduction of the horse and the gun greatly expanded the killing power of the plains Natives. That was followed by the policy of indiscriminate killing by European Americans and Canadians for both commercial reasons and to weaken the independence of plains Natives, and caused a dramatic drop in bison numbers from millions to a few hundred in a century's time, and almost caused their extinction.

=== Farming and ranching ===
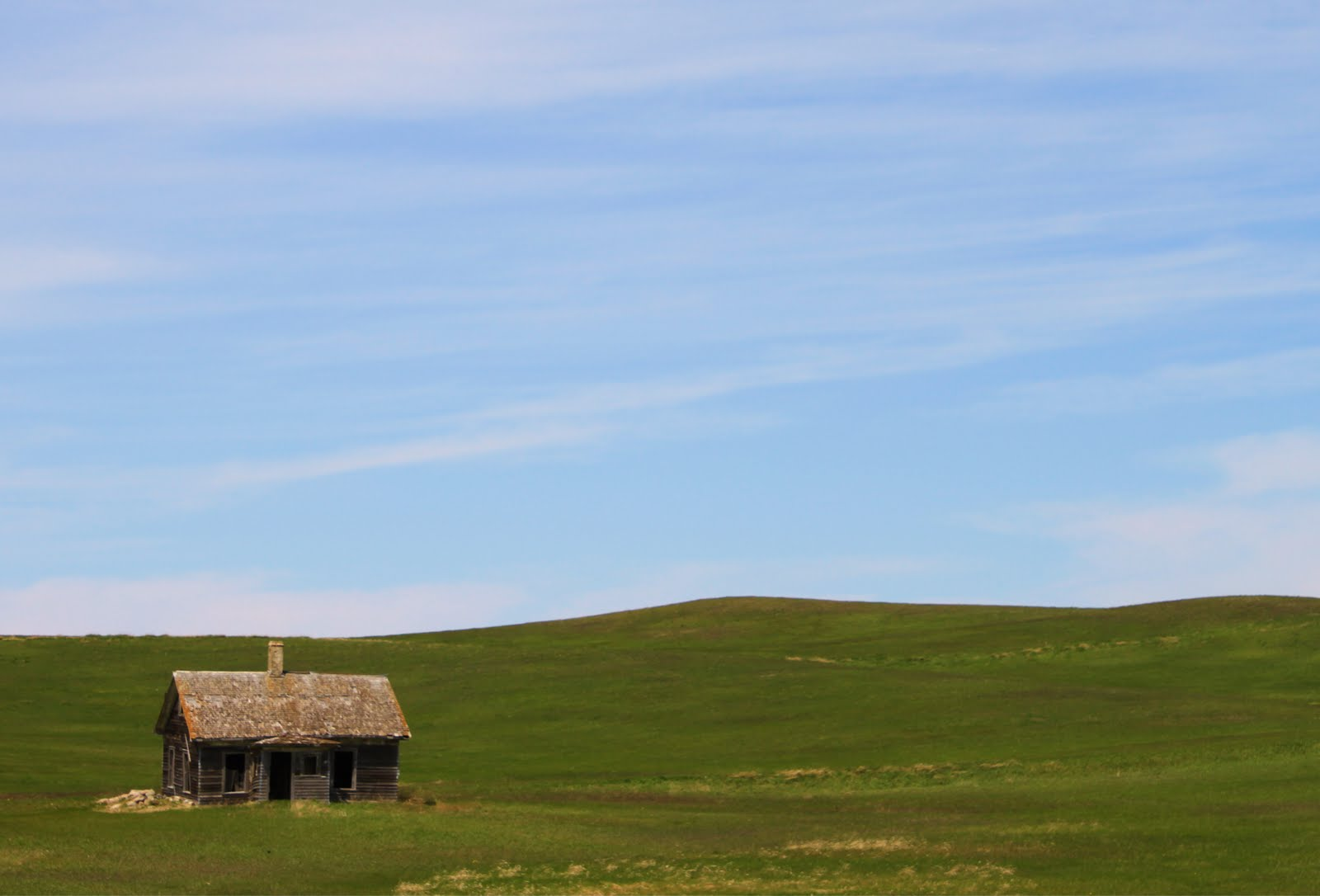
The Prairie Homestead, Milepost 213 on I-29, South Dakota (May 2010)

The very dense soil plagued the first European settlers who were using wooden plows, which were more suitable for loose forest soil. On the prairie, the plows bounced around, and the soil stuck to them. This problem was solved in 1837 by an Illinois blacksmith named John Deere who developed a steel moldboard plow that was stronger and cut the roots, making the fertile soils ready for farming. Former grasslands are now among the most productive agricultural lands on Earth.

The tallgrass prairie has been converted into one of the most intensive crop producing areas in North America. Less than one tenth of one percent (<0.09%) of the original landcover of the tallgrass prairie biome remains. Much of what persists is in cemetery prairies, railroad rights-of-way, or rocky/sandy/hilly places unsuitable for agriculture. States formerly with landcover in native tallgrass prairie including Iowa, Illinois, Minnesota, Wisconsin, Nebraska, and Missouri have become valued for their highly productive soils and are included in the Corn Belt. As an example of this land use intensity, Illinois and Iowa rank 49th and 50th, out of 50 US states, in total uncultivated land remaining.

Drier shortgrass prairies were once used mostly for open-range ranching. With the development of barbed wire in the 1870s and improved irrigation techniques, this region has mostly been converted to cropland and small fenced pastures. In southern Canada, Palliser's Triangle has been changed into one of the most important sources of wheat in the world as a result of improved methods of watering wheat fields (along with the rest of the Southern prairie provinces which also grow wheat, canola and many other grains). Despite those advances in farming technology, the area is still very prone to extended periods of drought, which can be disastrous for the industry if it is significantly prolonged.

=== Biofuels ===
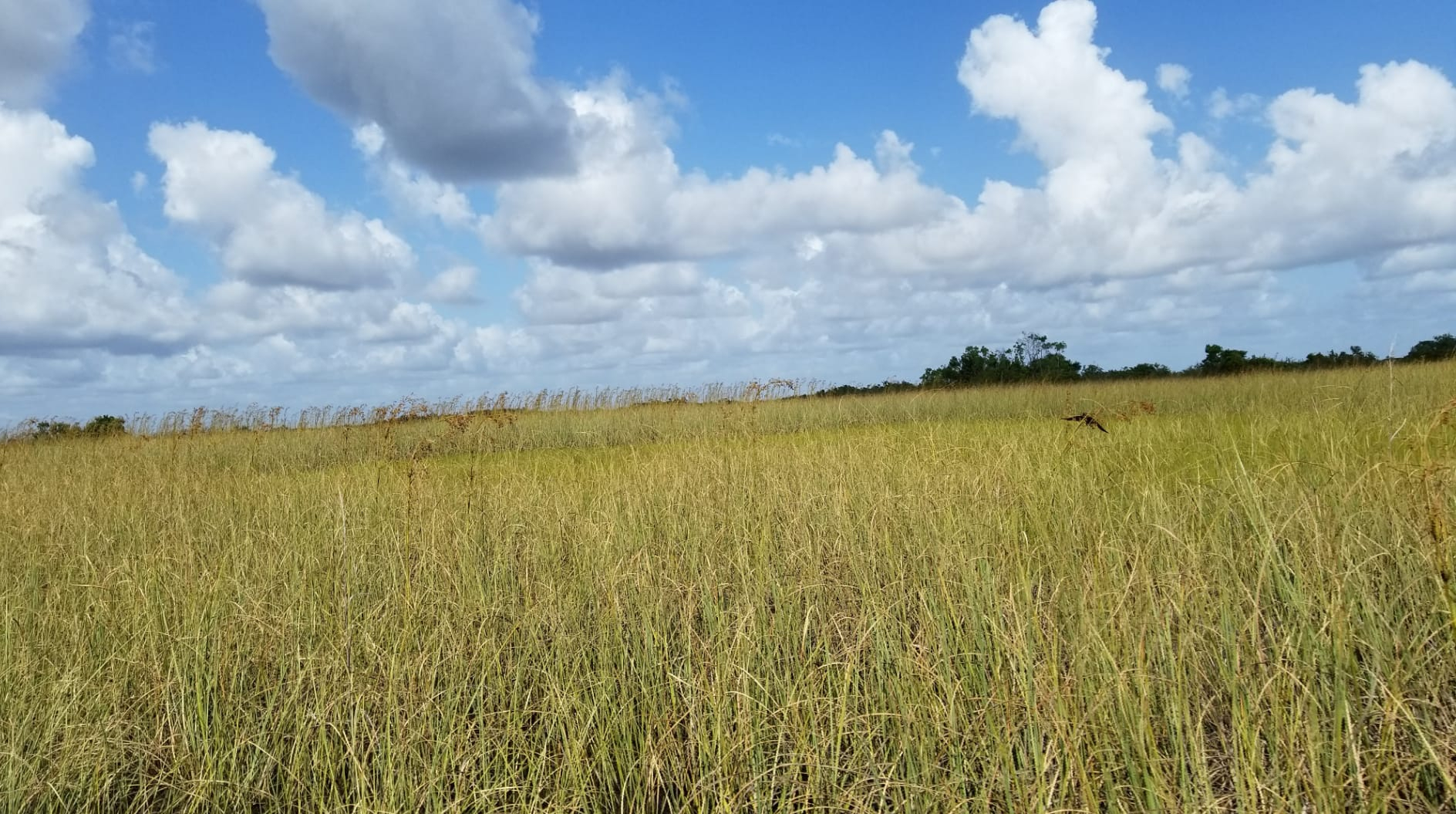
Sawgrass prairie in Everglades

Research by David Tilman, ecologist at the University of Minnesota, suggests "Biofuels made from high-diversity mixtures of prairie plants can reduce global warming by removing carbon dioxide from the atmosphere. Even when grown on infertile soils, they can provide a substantial portion of global energy needs, and leave fertile land for food production." Unlike corn and soybeans, which are both directly and indirectly major food crops, including livestock feed, prairie grasses are not used for human consumption. Prairie grasses can be grown in infertile soil, eliminating the cost of adding nutrients to the soil. Tilman and his colleagues estimate that prairie grass biofuels would yield 51 percent more energy per acre than ethanol from corn grown on fertile land. Some plants commonly used are lupine, big bluestem (turkey foot), blazing star, switchgrass, and prairie clover.

== Preservation ==
Because rich and thick topsoil made the land well suited for agricultural use, only 1% of tallgrass prairie remains in the U.S. today. Shortgrass prairie is more abundant.

Significant preserved areas of prairie include:

- Alderville Black Oak Savanna; Rice Lake, Ontario
- American Prairie, Phillips and Blaine counties, Montana
- Clymer Meadow Preserve, Hunt County, Texas
- Cypress Hills Interprovincial Park, Alberta and Saskatchewan
- Goose Lake Prairie State Natural Area, Grundy County, Illinois
- Grasslands National Park, Saskatchewan
- Hoosier Prairie, Lake County, Indiana
- James Woodworth Prairie Preserve, a virgin prairie owned by the University of Illinois, Glenview, Illinois
- Jennings Environmental Education Center, Pennsylvania
- Kissimmee Prairie Preserve State Park, Okeechobee County, Florida
- Konza Prairie, Manhattan, Kansas
- Midewin National Tallgrass Prairie, in Will County, Illinois
- Mnoké Prairie, Indiana Dunes National Park, Porter, Indiana
- Nachusa Grasslands, a Nature Conservancy preserve near Franklin Grove, Illinois
- Wichita Mountains Wildlife Refuge, in Comanche County, Oklahoma
- Neal Smith National Wildlife Refuge, Iowa
- Nine-Mile Prairie, Nebraska
- Ojibway prairie in Windsor, Ontario
- Paynes Prairie Preserve State Park, Alachua County, Florida
- Richard Bong State Recreation Area, in Kenosha County, Wisconsin
- Russell R. Kirt Prairie, College of DuPage, Illinois
- Tallgrass Aspen Parkland, Manitoba and Minnesota
- Tallgrass Prairie National Preserve, Kansas
- Tallgrass Prairie Preserve 32,000 acres (130 km^{2}), Oklahoma
- University of Wisconsin–Madison Arboretum, University of Wisconsin–Madison, Wisconsin
- Zumwalt Prairie, Wallowa County, Oregon

=== Virgin prairies ===
Virgin prairie refers to prairie land which has never been plowed. Small virgin prairies exist in the American Midwestern states and in Canada. Restored prairie refers to a prairie that has been reseeded after plowing or other disturbance.

=== Prairie garden ===
A prairie garden is a garden consisting primarily of plants from a prairie.

== Physiography ==
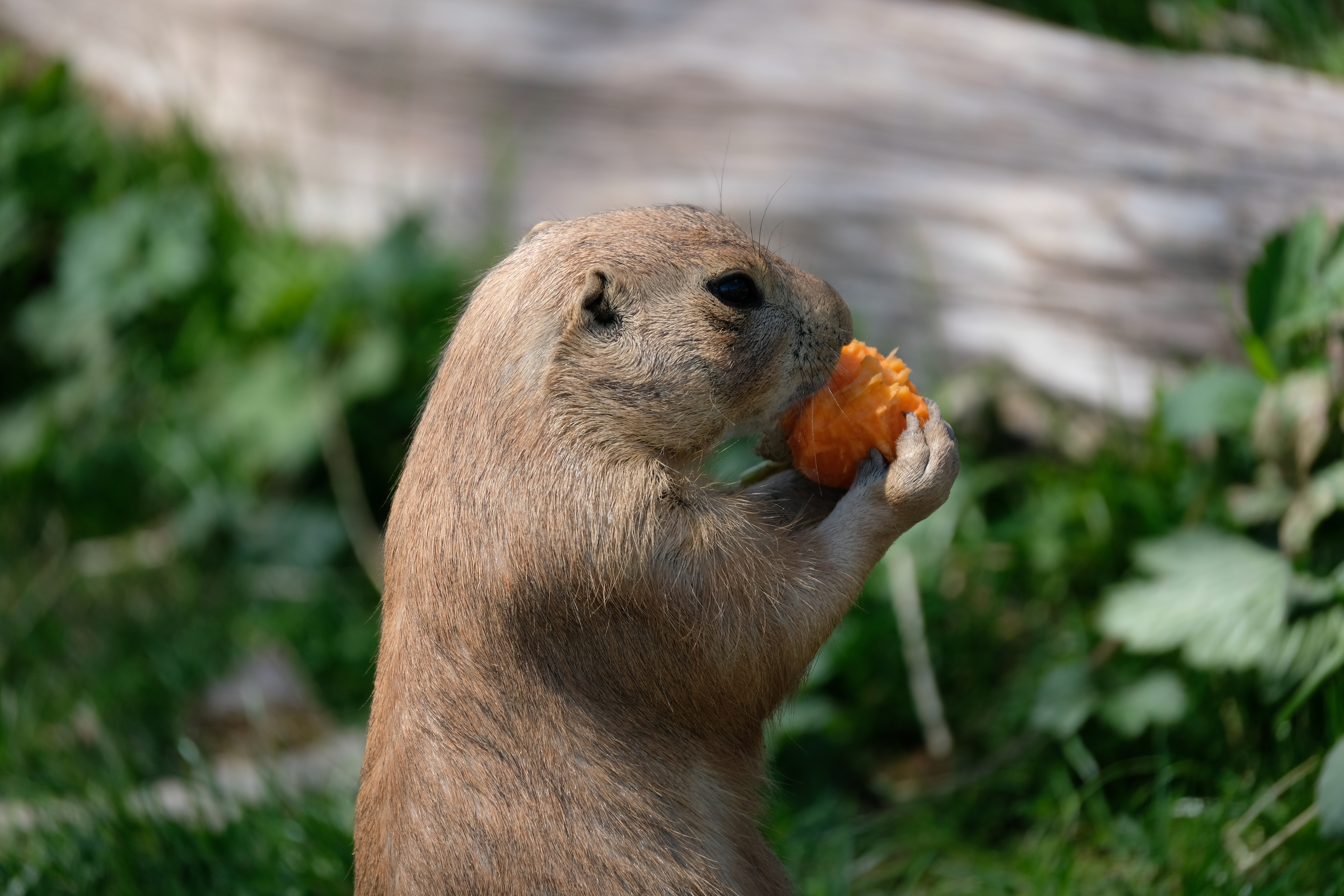
A large area with fertile soil is a good habitat for prairie dogs.

The originally treeless prairies of the upper Mississippi basin began in Indiana and extended westward and north-westward until they merged with the drier region known as the Great Plains. An eastward extension of the same area, originally tree-covered, extended to central Ohio. Thus, the prairies generally lie between the Ohio and Missouri rivers on the south and the Great Lakes on the north. The prairies are a contribution of the glacial period. They consist of glacial drift deposited unconformably on an underlying rock surface of moderate or small relief. Here, the rocks are an extension of the same stratified Palaeozoic formations already described as occurring in the Appalachian region and around the Great Lakes. They are usually fine-textured limestones and shales lying horizontal. The moderate or small relief they were given by mature preglacial erosion is now buried under the drift.

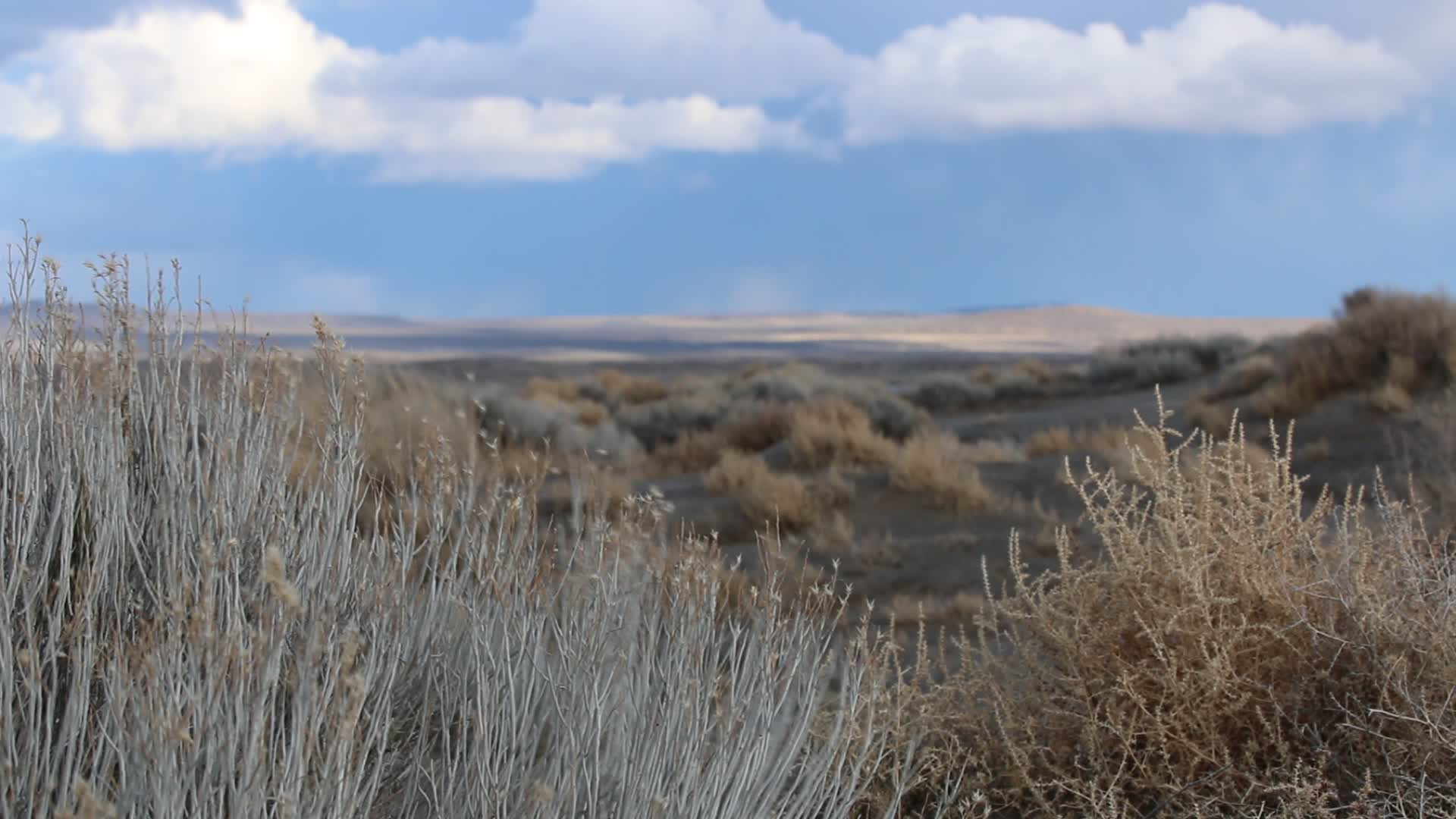
View of sand dunes and vegetation at Fossil Lake, with the Christmas Valley Sand Dunes, Feb. 21, 2017

The most significant area of the prairies, from Indiana to North Dakota, consists of till plains, that is, sheets of unstratified drift. The plains are 30, 50 or even 100 ft (up to 30 m) thick covering the underlying rock surface for thousands of square miles except where postglacial stream erosion has locally laid it bare. The plains have an extraordinarily even surface. The till is presumably made in part of preglacial soils, but it is largely composed of rock waste mechanically transported by the creeping ice sheets. Although the crystalline rocks from Canada and some of the more resistant stratified rocks south of the Great Lakes occur as boulders and stones, a great part of the till has been crushed and ground to a clayey texture. The till plains, although sweeping in broad swells of slowly changing altitude, often appear level to the eye with a view stretching to the horizon. Here and there, faint depressions occur, occupied by marshy sloughs or floored with a rich black soil of postglacial origin. Thus, by sub-glacial aggradation, the prairies have been leveled up to a smooth surface, in contrast to the higher and non-glaciated hilly country just to the south.

The great ice sheets formed terminal moraines around their border at various stages. However, the morainic belts are of slight relief in comparison to the great area of the ice. They rise gently from the till plains to 50, 100 or more feet. They may be one, two or three miles (5 km) wide and their hilly surface, dotted over with boulders, contains many small lakes in basins or hollows, instead of streams in valleys. The morainic belts are arranged in groups of concentric loops, convex southward, because the ice sheets advanced in lobes along the lowlands of the Great Lakes. Neighboring morainic loops join each other in re-entrants (north-pointing cusps), where two adjacent glacial lobes came together and formed their moraines in largest volume. The moraines are of too small relief to be shown on any maps except of the largest scale. Small as they are, they are the chief relief of the prairie states, and, in association with the nearly imperceptible slopes of the till plains, they determine the course of many streams and rivers, which as a whole are consequent upon the surface form of the glacial deposits.

The complexity of the glacial period and its subdivision into several glacial epochs, separated by interglacial epochs of considerable length (certainly longer than the postglacial epoch) has a structural consequence in the superposition of successive till sheets, alternating with non-glacial deposits. It also has a physiographic consequence in the very different amount of normal postglacial erosion suffered by the different parts of the glacial deposits. The southernmost drift sheets, as in southern Iowa and northern Missouri, have lost their initially plain surface and are now maturely dissected into gracefully rolling forms. Here, the valleys of even the small streams are well opened and graded, and marshes and lakes are rare. These sheets are of early Pleistocene origin. Nearer the Great Lakes, the till sheets are trenched only by the narrow valleys of the large streams. Marshy sloughs still occupy the faint depressions in the till plains and the associated moraines have abundant small lakes in their undrained hollows. These drift sheets are of late Pleistocene origin.

When the ice sheets extended to the land sloping southward to the Ohio River, Mississippi River and Missouri River, the drift-laden streams flowed freely away from the ice border. As the streams escaped from their subglacial channels, they spread into broader channels and deposited some of their load, and thus aggraded their courses. Local sheets or aprons of gravel and sand are spread more or less abundantly along the outer side of the morainic belts. Long trains of gravel and sands clog the valleys that lead southward from the glaciated to the non-glaciated area. Later, when the ice retreated further and the unloaded streams returned to their earlier degrading habit, they more or less completely scoured out the valley deposits, the remains of which are now seen in terraces on either side of the present flood plains.

When the ice of the last glacial epoch had retreated so far that its front border lay on a northward slope, belonging to the drainage area of the Great Lakes, bodies of water accumulated in front of the ice margin, forming glacio-marginal lakes. The lakes were small at first, and each had its own outlet at the lowest depression of land to the south. As the ice melted further back, neighboring lakes became confluent at the level of the lowest outlet of the group. The outflowing streams grew in the same proportion and eroded a broad channel across the height of land and far down stream, while the lake waters built sand reefs or carved shore cliffs along their margin, and laid down sheets of clay on their floors. All of these features are easily recognized in the prairie region. The present site of Chicago was determined by an Indian portage or carry across the low divide between Lake Michigan and the headwaters of the Illinois River. This divide lies on the floor of the former outlet channel of the glacial Lake Michigan. Corresponding outlets are known for Lake Erie, Lake Huron, and Lake Superior. A very large sheet of water, named Lake Agassiz, once overspread a broad till plain in northern Minnesota and North Dakota. The outlet of this glacial lake, called river Warren, eroded a large channel in which the Minnesota River evident today. The Red River of the North flows northward through a plain formerly covered by Lake Agassiz.

Certain extraordinary features were produced when the retreat of the ice sheet had progressed so far as to open an eastward outlet for the marginal lakes. This outlet occurred along the depression between the northward slope of the Appalachian plateau in west-central New York and the southward slope of the melting ice sheet. When this eastward outlet came to be lower than the south-westward outlet across the height of land to the Ohio or Mississippi river, the discharge of the marginal lakes was changed from the Mississippi system to the Hudson system. Many well-defined channels, cutting across the north-sloping spurs of the plateau in the neighborhood of Syracuse, New York mark the temporary paths of the ice-bordered outlet river. Successive channels are found at lower and lower levels on the plateau slope, indicating the successive courses taken by the lake outlet as the ice melted further and further back. On some of the channels, deep gorges were eroded heading in temporary cataracts which exceeded Niagara in height but not in breadth. The pools excavated by the plunging waters at the head of the gorges are now occupied by little lakes. The most significant stage in this series of changes occurred when the glacio-marginal lake waters were lowered so that the long escarpment of Niagara limestone was laid bare in western New York. The previously confluent waters were then divided into two lakes. The higher one, Lake Erie, supplied the outflowing Niagara River, which poured its waters down the escarpment to the lower, Lake Ontario. That gave rise to Niagara Falls. Lake Ontario's outlet for a time ran down the Mohawk Valley to the Hudson River. At the higher elevation, it was known as Lake Iroquois. When ice melted from the northeastern end of the lake, it dropped to a lower level, and drained through the St. Lawrence area creating a lower base level for the Niagara River and increasing its erosive capacity.

In certain districts, the subglacial till was not spread out in a smooth plain, but accumulated in elliptical mounds, 100–200 feet. high and 0.5 to 1 mile (0.80 to 1.61 kilometres) long with axes parallel to the direction of the ice motion as indicated by striae on the underlying rock floor. These hills are known by the Irish name, drumlins, used for similar hills in north-western Ireland. The most remarkable groups of drumlins occur in western New York, where their number is estimated at over 6,000, and in southern Wisconsin, where it is placed at 5,000. They completely dominate the topography of their districts.

A curious deposit of an impalpably fine and unstratified silt, known by the German name bess (or loess), lies on the older drift sheets near the larger river courses of the upper Mississippi basin. It attains a thickness of 20 ft (6.1 m) or more near the rivers and gradually fades away at a distance of ten or more miles (16 or more km) on either side. It contains land shells, and hence cannot be attributed to marine or lacustrine submergence. The best explanation is that, during certain phases of the glacial period, it was carried as dust by the winds from the flood plains of aggrading rivers, and slowly deposited on the neighboring grass-covered plains. The glacial and eolian origin of this sediment is evidenced by the angularity of its grains (a bank of it will stand without slumping for years), whereas, if it had been transported significantly by water, the grains would have been rounded and polished. Loess is parent material for an extremely fertile, but droughty soil.

Southwestern Wisconsin and parts of the adjacent states of Illinois, Iowa, and Minnesota are known as the driftless zone, because, although bordered by drift sheets and moraines, it is free from glacial deposits. It must therefore have been a sort of oasis, when the ice sheets from the north advanced past it on the east and west, and joined around its southern border. The reason for this exemption from glaciation is the converse of that for the southward convexity of the morainic loops. While they mark the paths of greatest glacial advance along lowland troughs (lake basins), the driftless zone is a district protected from ice invasion by reason of the obstruction which the highlands of northern Wisconsin and Michigan (part of the Superior upland) offered to glacial advance.

The course of the upper Mississippi River is largely consequent upon glacial deposits. Its sources are in the morainic lakes in northern Minnesota. The drift deposits thereabouts are so heavy that the present divides between the drainage basins of Hudson Bay, Lake Superior, and the Gulf of Mexico evidently stand in no very definite relation to the preglacial divides. The course of the Mississippi through Minnesota is largely guided by the form of the drift cover. Several rapids and the Saint Anthony Falls (determining the site of Minneapolis) are signs of immaturity, resulting from superposition through the drift on the under rock. Further south, as far as the entrance of the Ohio River, the Mississippi follows a rock-walled valley 300 to 400 ft (91 to 122 m) deep, with a flood-plain 2 to 4 mi (3.2 to 6.4 km) wide. This valley seems to represent the path of an enlarged early-glacial Mississippi, when much precipitation that is today discharged to Hudson Bay and the Gulf of St. Lawrence was delivered to the Gulf of Mexico, for the curves of the present river are of distinctly smaller radii than the curves of the valley. Lake Pepin (30 mi [48 km] below St. Paul), a picturesque expansion of the river across its flood-plain, is due to the aggradation of the valley floor where the Chippewa River, coming from the northeast, brought an overload of fluvio-glacial drift. Hence, even the father of waters, like so many other rivers in the Northern states, owes many of its features more or less directly to glacial action.

The fertility of the prairies is a natural consequence of their origin. During the mechanical transportation of the till, no vegetation was present to remove the minerals essential to plant growth, as is the case in the soils of normally weathered and dissected peneplains. The soil is similar to the Appalachian piedmont which though not exhausted by the primeval forest cover, are by no means so rich as the till sheets of the prairies. Moreover, whatever the rocky understructure, the till soil has been averaged by a thorough mechanical mixture of rock grindings. Hence, the prairies are continuously fertile for scores of miles together. The true prairies were once covered with a rich growth of natural grass and annual flowering plants, but today, they are covered with farms.

== See also ==
- Great Plains

- Shortgrass prairie
- Mixed grass prairie
- Tallgrass prairie

- Prairies Ecozone
- Interior Plains
- Canadian Prairies
- Geography of North America
- North American Prairies province
- Aspen parkland
- Buffalo Commons
- Coastal plain
- Coastal prairie
- Dust Bowl
- Field
- Flooded grasslands and savannas
- Flood-meadow
- Grassland
- Heath
- Meadow
- Outback
- Pampas
- Pasture
- Plain
- Prairie dog
- Prairie madness
- Prairie restoration
- Puszta
- Rangeland
- Savanna
- Steppe
- Switchgrass
- Temperate grasslands, savannas, and shrublands
- Veld
- Water-meadow
- Wet meadow
