= Christmas Valley Sand Dunes =

Natural sand dune complex in Lake County, Oregon, United States

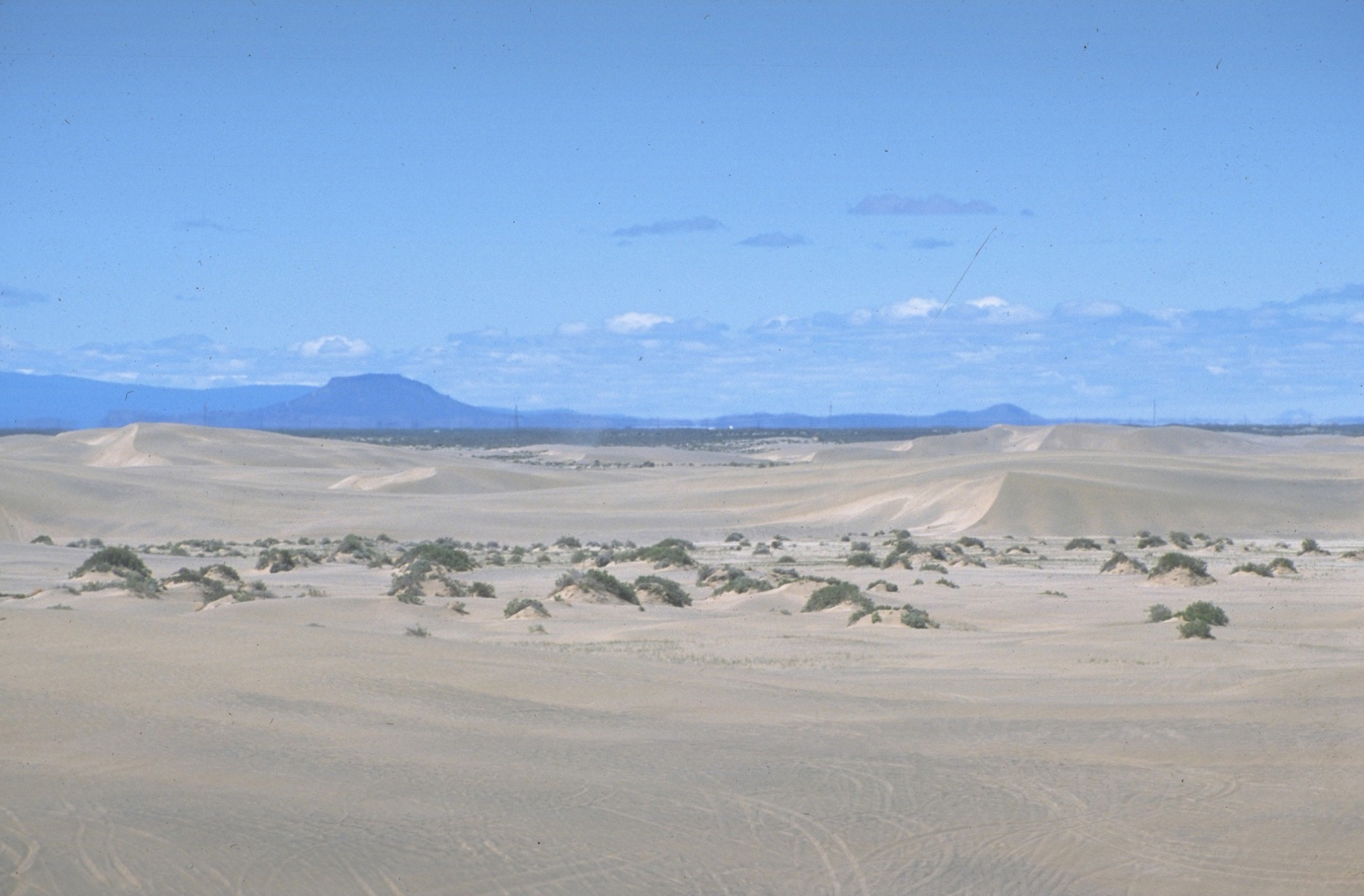
- Bureau of Land Management, Lakeview District

- Location within Oregon
- Floor elevation: 4,318 ft (1,316 m)
- Area: 18 mi^{2} (47 km^{2})

Geography
- Country: United States
- State: Oregon
- County: Lake
- Coordinates: 43.31203°N 120.43183°W
- Interactive map of Christmas Valley Sand Dunes

The Christmas Valley Sand Dunes are a natural sand dune complex covering 11,000 acres (45 km^{2}) of public lands east of Christmas Valley in Lake County, Oregon, United States, about 100 miles (160 km) southeast of Bend. The area is accessible via the Christmas Valley National Back Country Byway. The dunes are up to 60 feet (18 m) high. It is the largest inland shifting sand dune system in the Pacific Northwest. The dunes are composed mostly of ash and pumice from the eruption of Mount Mazama that formed Crater Lake 7,000 years ago. Approximately 8,900 acres (36 km^{2}) of dunes are open to vehicles.

== Administration ==
The Christmas Valley Sand Dunes area is administered by Bureau of Land Management. The Bureau of Land Management also oversees the Lost Forest Research Natural Area, east of the dunes as well as the land around nearby Fossil Lake to the west In 1983, the Bureau of Land Management joined the Christmas Valley Sand Dunes, Lost Forest Research Natural Area, and Fossil Lake into a single Area of Critical Environmental Concern. There are vehicle restrictions in much of the consolidated Area of Critical Environmental Concern. However, approximately 8,900 acres (3,600 ha) of dune area remains open to vehicle use. Off-road vehicles are allowed only on specific routes and in designated areas. Camping is restricted to designated sites within the Area of Critical Environmental Concern. All of the camp sites are primitive with no water or restrooms. The nearest public facilities are located in the unincorporated community of Christmas Valley, approximately 16 miles (26 km) away.

== Recreation ==
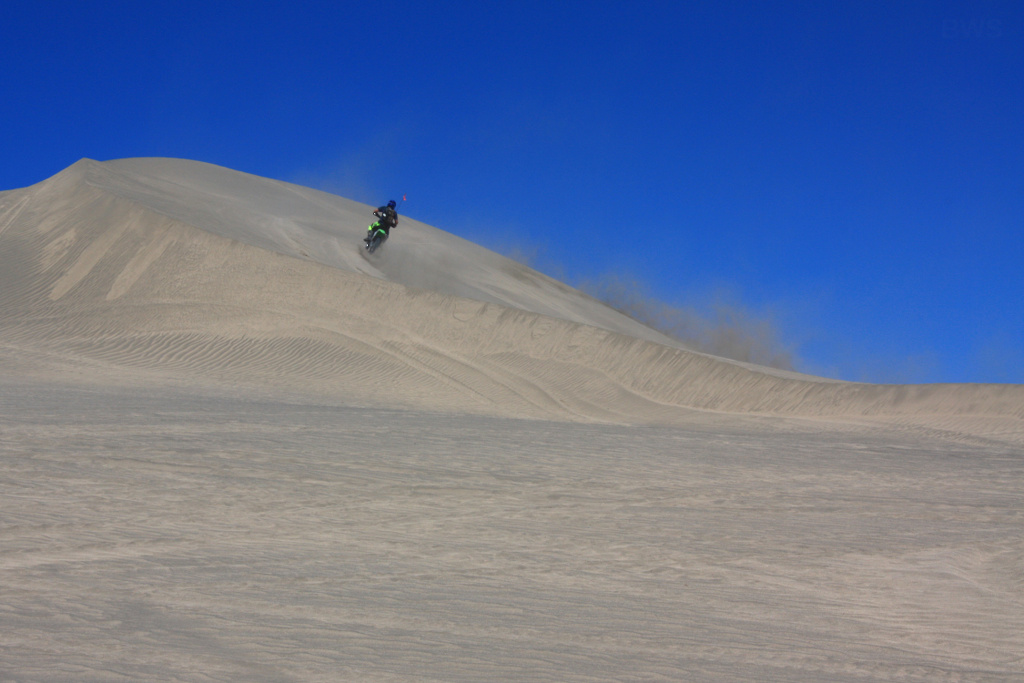
Motorcyclist climbs a dune

The dunes are available for off-road and ATV recreational use in designated areas. All Oregon state laws and regulations pertaining to off-highway vehicles apply. Vehicle operators must have a valid driver's license, state-issued all-terrain vehicle operator's permit, or be accompanied by someone 18 or older with a valid driver's license. In addition, all off-road vehicles must have a red or orange flag on an extended antenna while driving on the dunes. State alcohol and drugs laws also apply to all vehicle operator and passengers. A $10 Oregon ATV operator permit may be required. A valid driver's license in addition to an Oregon DOT helmet for persons under 18 years of age.

The Bureau of Land Management Road 6121 has been improved with gravel allowing access to the dunes during most of the winter and spring months.

== See also ==
- Oregon Dunes National Recreation Area

== Gallery ==
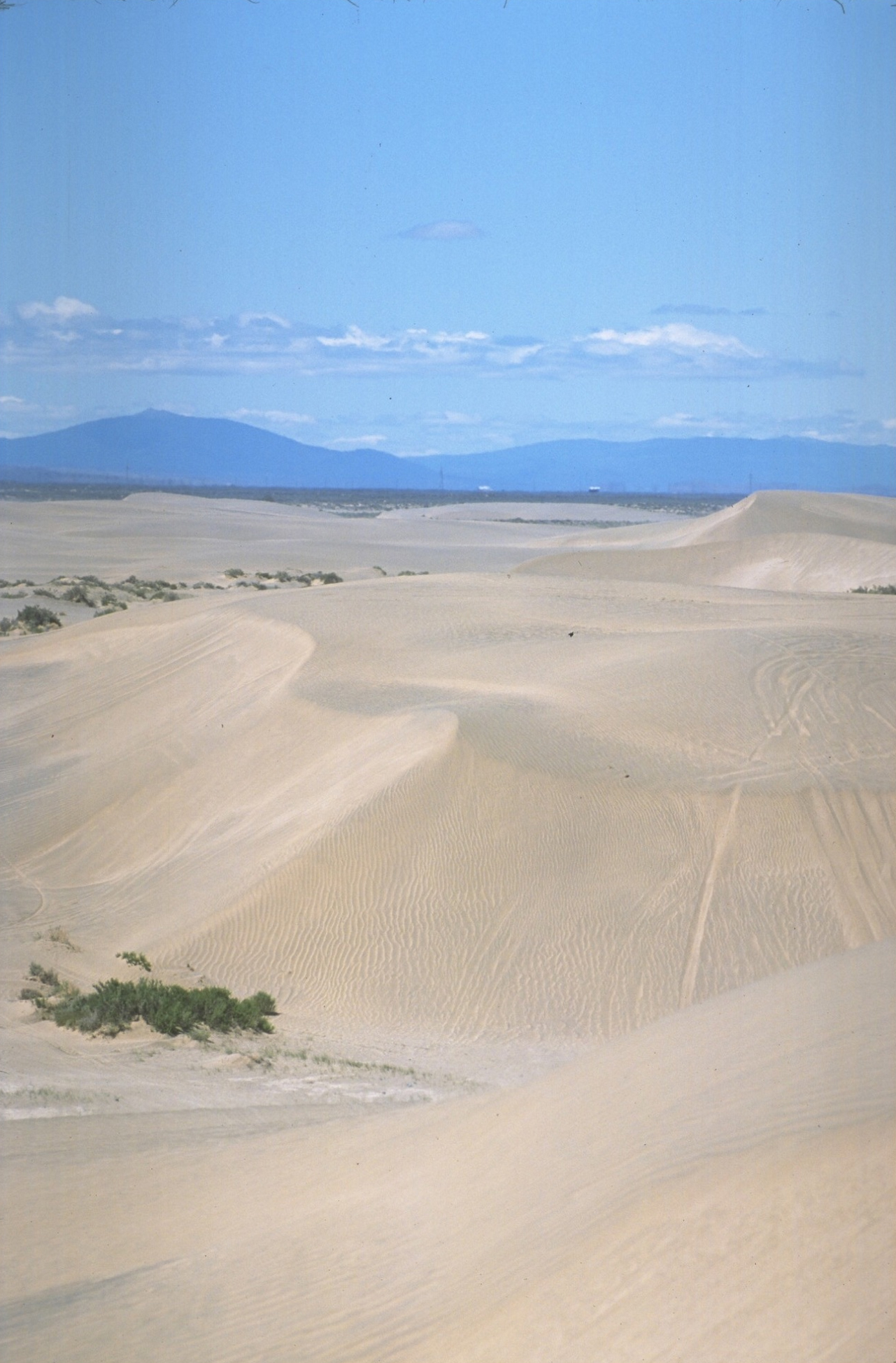
High shifting dunes

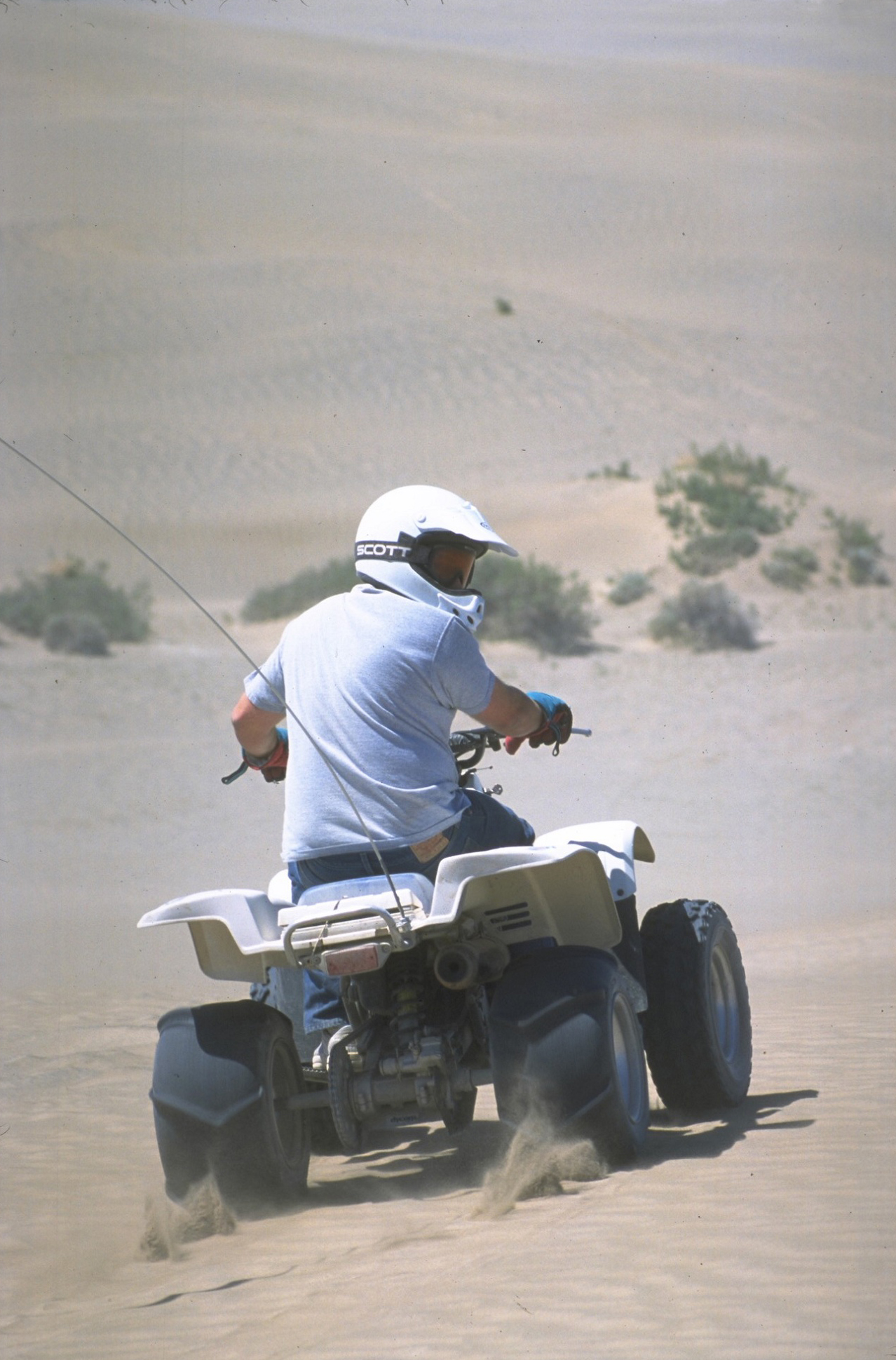
All terrain vehicle run
