= Buffalo Commons =

Proposed nature preserve in the American Great Plains

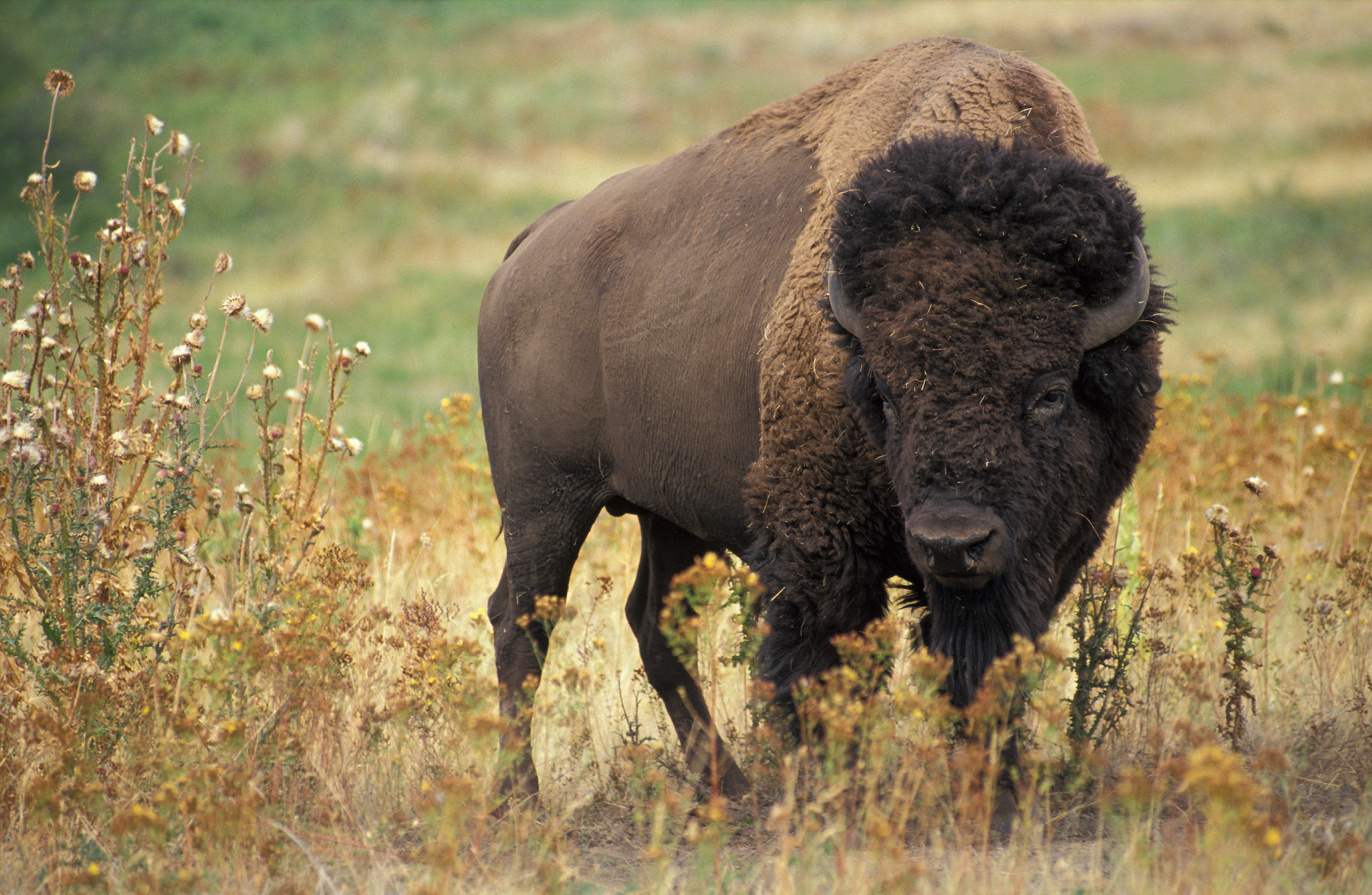
American bison

The Buffalo Commons is a conceptual proposal to create a vast nature preserve by returning 139,000 square miles (360,000 km^{2}) of the drier portion of the Great Plains to native prairie, and by reintroducing the American bison ("buffalo"), that once grazed the shortgrass prairie. The proposal would affect ten states: Montana, Wyoming, Colorado, Oklahoma, New Mexico, Texas, North Dakota, South Dakota, Nebraska, and Kansas.

== History ==
The proposal originated with Frank J. Popper and Deborah Popper, who argued in a 1987 essay that the current use of the drier parts of the plains is not sustainable. The authors viewed the historic European-American settlement of the Plains States as hampered by lack of understanding of the ecology and an example of the "Tragedy of the Commons". Many people in potentially affected states resisted the concept during the 1990s.

== Cause ==
The Poppers note that periodic disasters such as the Dust Bowl and continuing significant population loss over the last 80 years show the area is not sustainable for large-scale farming. They note that the rural Plains has lost a third of its population since 1920. Several hundred thousand square miles of the Great Plains have fewer than 6 persons per square mile. This was the population density standard of settlement which historian Frederick Jackson Turner used in his "Frontier Thesis" to declare the American Frontier "closed" in 1893. Large areas have fewer than 2 persons per square mile. The Poppers demonstrated that the number of "frontier counties" increased by 14 between 1980 and 2000, mostly on the Plains, and noted that there are more than 6,000 ghost towns in the state of Kansas alone (according to Kansas historian Daniel Fitzgerald). They claim that the decline in population on the plains is accelerating.

== Details ==
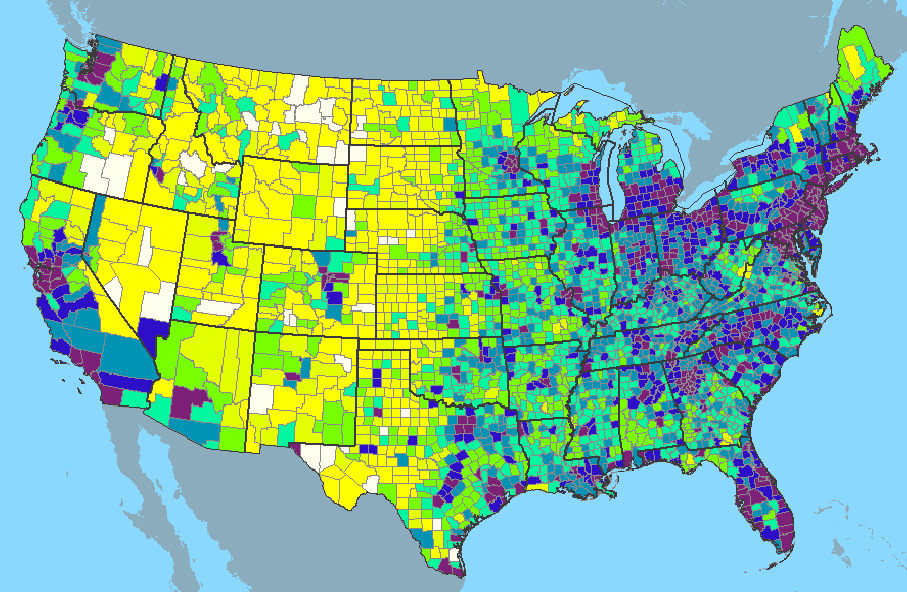
2000 U.S. population density in persons per sq. mile: yellow 1-4, light green, 5-9

The Poppers propose that a significant portion of the region be gradually shifted from farming and ranching use. They envision an area of native grassland, of perhaps 10 or 20 million acres (40,000 or 80,000 km^{2}) in size. One way to achieve this would be through voluntary contracts between the Forest Service and Plains farmers and ranchers, in which owners would be paid the value of what they would have cultivated over the next 15 years. In the meantime, they would be required to plant and reestablish native Shortgrass prairie grasses and forbs, according to a Forest Service-approved program. At the end of the period, the Forest Service would purchase their holdings, while granting owners a 40-acre (160,000 m^{2}) homestead. Since their initial article in 1987, the Poppers have acknowledged that many other parties have very important roles to play. They do not see the federal government as central as they first did.

== Outcomes ==
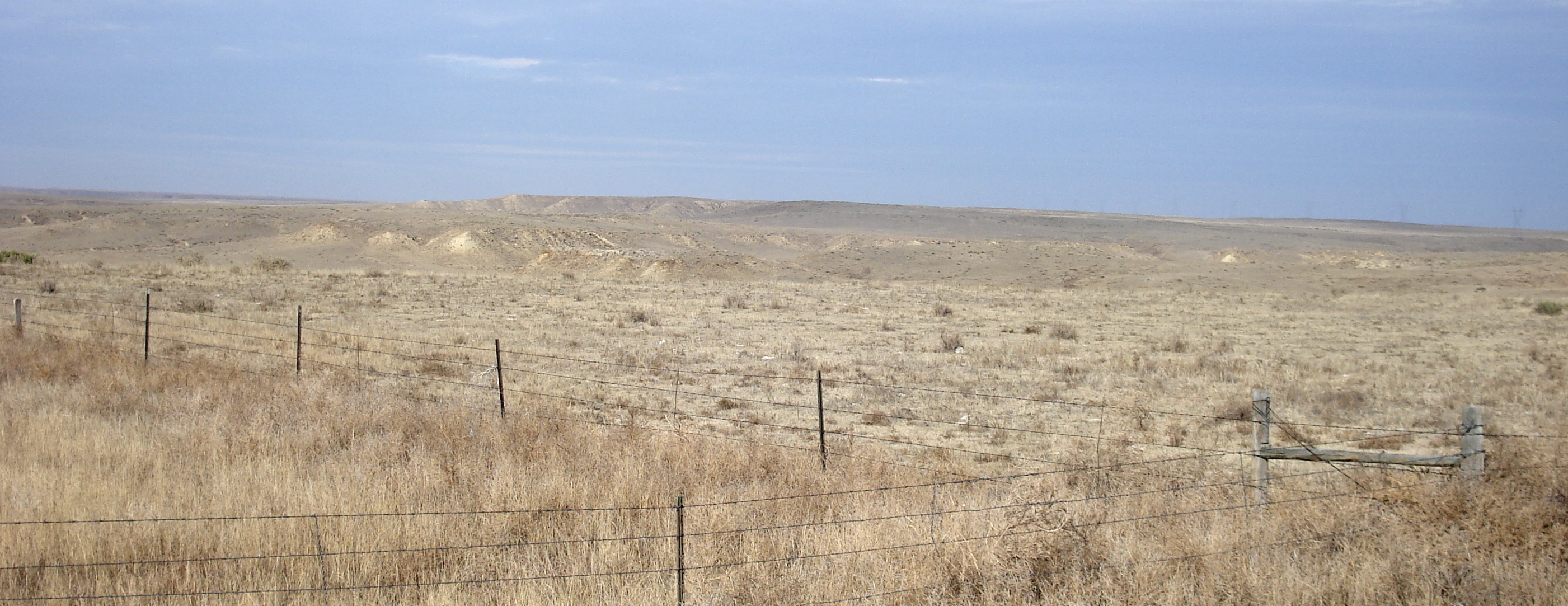
High Plains grazing land in Morgan County, Colorado

The proposal attracted some public attention, particularly since several Plains states and Native Americans on their reservations had already started reintroduction of bison. Many Plains residents intensely criticized the concept, especially in the first years. They point out that much of rural flight is due to mechanization of agriculture, wherefore fewer people are needed to produce the same amount (or more) of agriculture output, not because farms are failing. Proponents answer that the criticism is based on a misunderstood assumption that the plan would be coercive rather than voluntary.

Given the pace of rural depopulation, many scholars believe that aspects of the proposal are likely to happen with or without national government involvement. States, non-profit community development groups, and Native American nations have found the concept supports some of their own ideas about the future. Some are working independently or partnering on related ecological and sustainability issues. In the last decade, as the Poppers talk about the concept, they acknowledge there are many players. They have seen many partnerships come about, including private and non-governmental initiatives.

The Poppers draw parallels between the Plains and Northern New England, which had agricultural depopulation following the opening of transportation to the West in the 1830s. In New England, the dominant forests have returned, taking over former areas of agricultural cultivation which were abandoned.

North Dakota's 2000 economic roadmap noted the Buffalo Commons idea was "vilified", but had elements that could be of use to the state. The report suggested the concept could increase revenues from tourism. This was just one among many economic development avenues suggested in the report.

The only population that has increased on the plains is that of various Native American nations. Some of these have started to raise bison, in part for tourism and ecological value, as well as its primary place in their traditional cultures. In 1992 Native American tribes started the InterTribal Buffalo Council. The consortium now includes 82 Native American tribes in 20 states. It trains Indian buffalo producers and tribal land managers, and takes other steps to reinvigorate buffalo's historically central place in their cultures. The buffalo count on Indian land has at least tripled since 1992. As of 2009, the tribes collectively managed 15,000 bison. Non-profits and private owners have also been raising bison; by 2001, the number of bison on the Plains had increased to a total of 300,000.

As of 2009, the high plains population continued to decline, local economies continued to shrink, and the region's major water resource, the Ogallala Aquifer, had shrunk more quickly than had been expected. Public perceptions of the concept of the Buffalo Commons have begun to change. In November 2009 The Kansas City Star published an editorial that claimed the aquifer was almost depleted and noted the biggest asset of the high plains was its prairie. It supported the creation of a million-acre (4,000 km^{2}) Buffalo Commons National Park in western Kansas. The editorial suggested such a park could satisfy several goals:

- attract tourists who would stimulate the economies of nearby towns;
- provide carbon sequestration by the prairies; and
- protect America's natural and cultural heritage.

== See also ==
- American Prairie
- Buffalo Treaty
- Conservation of American bison
- Depopulation of the Great Plains
- Great American Desert
