= Depopulation of the Great Plains =

Large-scale migration of people from rural areas

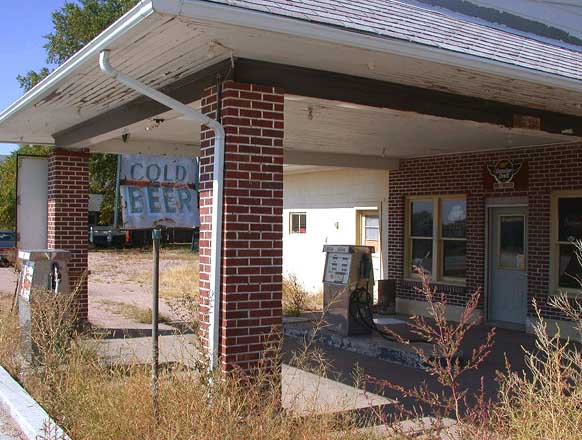
Abandoned gas station west of North Platte, Nebraska

The depopulation of the Great Plains refers to the large-scale migration of people from rural areas of the Great Plains of the United States to more urban areas and to the east and west coasts during the 20th century. This phenomenon of rural-to-urban migration has occurred to some degree in most areas of the United States, but has been especially pronounced in the Great Plains states, including Texas, Oklahoma, Kansas, Nebraska, South Dakota, North Dakota, Montana, Wyoming, Colorado, and New Mexico. Many Great Plains counties have lost more than 60 percent of their former populations.

Depopulation began in the early 1900s, accelerated in the Dust Bowl years of the 1920s and 1930s, and has generally continued through the national census in 2010. The population decline has been broadly attributed to numerous factors, especially changes in agricultural practices, rapid improvements in urban transit and regional connectivity, and a declining rural job market, pushed in part by the 1980s farm crisis.

== Geography ==
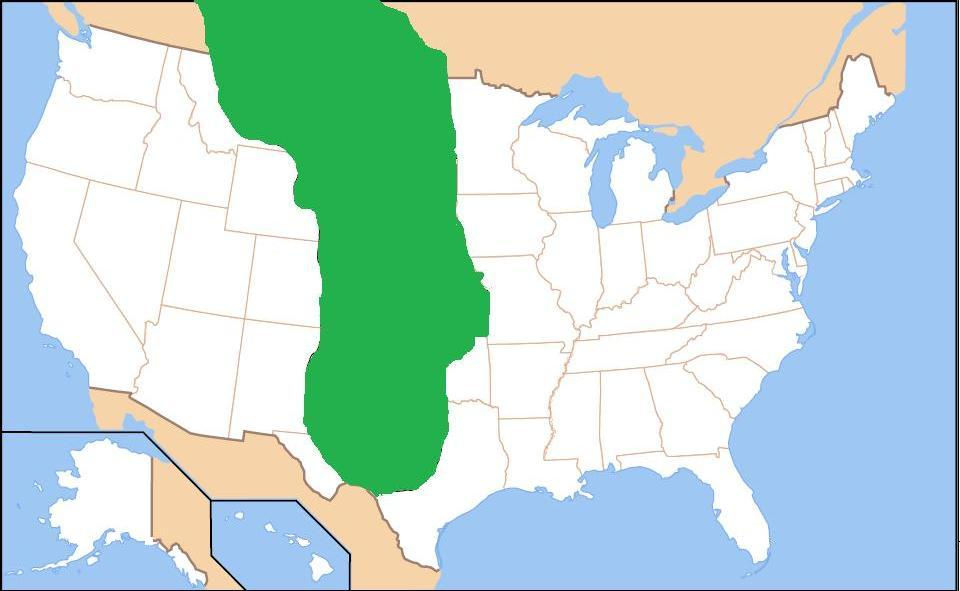
The Great Plains of the United States

Definitions vary as to what land comprises the Great Plains. The entire states of Kansas, Nebraska, South Dakota, and North Dakota are often considered part of the Great Plains. The Great Plains extend to parts of six additional states: Texas, Oklahoma, New Mexico, Colorado, Wyoming, and Montana. The eastern boundary is about 97 degrees W longitude and the Plains extend westward to the Rocky Mountains and southward from the border with Canada to the approximate latitude of Austin, Texas. A somewhat more restrictive definition by the U.S. Census Bureau gives a total area of the Great Plains in the United States as 533,100 square miles (1,381,000 km^{2}), 18 percent of the area of the entire United States.

The Great Plains are distinguished by generally flat land and a natural vegetation cover consisting mostly of expansive grasslands. The eastern part of the Great Plains is dominated by agriculture, with wheat being the most common and important crop. The western part is more arid and is primarily used for grazing cattle and irrigated agriculture.

== Population history ==
Large-scale settlement of the Great Plains by farmers and ranchers began with the end of the Civil War in 1865. By the late 1870s the Plains Indians had been defeated militarily and were largely confined to reservations. Drawn by the free land made available by the Homestead Act, pioneer families quickly settled the region such that nearly all of the arable land was privately owned or on Indian reservations by 1900.

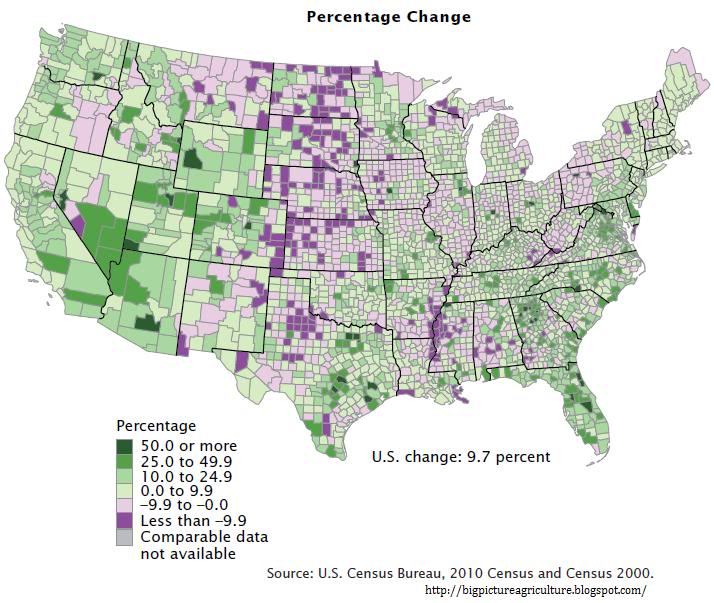
The purple areas on the map indicate counties losing population between 2000 and 2010. Most are on the Great Plains.

The initial rush to settle the Great Plains by hundreds of thousands of farmers and ranchers has been reversed because of several factors. Perhaps the most significant reasons have been economic. Over the course of the 20th century, farm economies saw dramatic shifts from small-scale family subsistence farming to larger commercial farms utilizing more equipment and less labor. Many family farms proved to be too small to survive. Farmers also used farming techniques which were unsuited to the dry, windy climate and the frequent droughts of the Great Plains. This became manifest during the Dust Bowl years of the 1930s, in which rural flight from the Great Plains accelerated, although the decline in population of some counties had begun as early as 1900. Better roads and the automobile permitted many farmers to live in larger towns and cities rather than on the farm itself. While urban areas on the Great Plains more than doubled in population, thousands of small towns and communities disappeared. Two-thirds of counties lost some part of their population between the early 1900s and the 2010 census, and, as the table below demonstrates, many rural counties lost more than 60 percent of their population. A few counties lost more than 80 percent of their population. Population density of some Great Plains counties dipped below two persons per square mile.

Governments have tried a variety of methods to stem the outflow of population from rural areas in the Great Plains. Some towns have offered free building lots to prospective residents, but the program has met with only limited success. The fundamental problem appears to be the few employment opportunities available in these small and isolated communities.

The population decline has led to proposals to return the land to its natural state and under public ownership. The Buffalo Commons proposal calls for large portions of the drier regions of the Great Plains to be returned to their original condition as pasture land for American bison and other plains animals.

== Counties with large population losses ==
The following Great Plains counties lost more than 60 percent of their population from the census year when they attained their highest population until 2020.

State and county name	Area in square miles (km sq) (includes both land and water area)	Greatest population (census year)	2020 population	Percentage decline in population	2020 population density per sq. mi
Colorado					
Baca	2,557 square miles (6,620 km^{2})	10,570 (1930)	3,506	-66.83%	1.37
Huerfano	1,593 square miles (4,130 km^{2})	17,062 (1930)	6,820	-60.03%	4.28
Kiowa	1,786 square miles (4,630 km^{2})	3,786 (1930)	1,446	-61.81%	0.81
Las Animas	4,775 square miles (12,370 km^{2})	38,975 (1930)	14,555	-62.66%	3.05
Iowa
Adams	426 square miles (1,100 km^{2})	13,601 (1900)	3,704	-72.77%	8.69
Fremont	517 square miles (1,340 km^{2})	18,546 (1900)	6,605	-62.58%	12.78
Monroe	434 square miles (1,120 km^{2})	25,429 (1900)	7,577	-70.20%	17.46
Ringgold	539 square miles (1,400 km^{2})	15,325 (1900)	4,663	-69.57%	8.65
Taylor	535 square miles (1,390 km^{2})	18,784 (1900)	5,896	-68.61%	11.02
Wayne	527 square miles (1,360 km^{2})	17,491 (1900)	6,495	-62.87%	12.32
Kansas
Chase	778 square miles (2,020 km^{2})	8,246 (1900)	2,572	-68.81%	3.31
Chautauqua	645 square miles (1,670 km^{2})	12,297 (1890)	3,379	-72.52%	5.24
Cheyenne	1,021 square miles (2,640 km^{2})	6,948 (1930)	2,616	-62.35%	2.56
Clark	977 square miles (2,530 km^{2})	4,989 (1920)	1,991	-60.09%	2.04
Comanche	790 square miles (2,000 km^{2})	5,302 (1920)	1,689	-68.14%	2.14
Decatur	894 square miles (2,320 km^{2})	9,234 (1900)	2,764	-70.07%	3.09
Edwards	622 square miles (1,610 km^{2})	7,295 (1930)	2,907	-60.15%	4.67
Elk	650 square miles (1,700 km^{2})	12,216 (1890)	2,483	-79.67%	3.82
Graham	899 square miles (2,330 km^{2})	8,700 (1910)	2,415	-72.24%	2.69
Greenwood	1,153 square miles (2,990 km^{2})	19,235 (1930)	6,016	-68.72%	5.22
Harper	803 square miles (2,080 km^{2})	14,748 (1910)	5,485	-62.81%	6.83
Jewell	914 square miles (2,370 km^{2})	19,420 (1900)	2,932	-84.90%	3.21
Kiowa	723 square miles (1,870 km^{2})	6,174 (1910)	2,460	-60.16%	3.40
Lincoln	720 square miles (1,900 km^{2})	10,142 (1910)	2,939	-71.02%	4.08
Mitchell	719 square miles (1,860 km^{2})	15,037 (1890)	5,796	-61.46%	8.06
Ness	1,075 square miles (2,780 km^{2})	8,358 (1930)	2,687	-67.85%	2.50
Osborne	864 square miles (2,240 km^{2})	12,827 (1910)	3,500	-72.71%	4.05
Phillips	895 square miles (2,320 km^{2})	14,442 (1900)	4,981	-65.51%	5.57
Rawlins	1,070 square miles (2,800 km^{2})	6,790 (1920)	2,561	-62.28%	2.39
Republic	720 square miles (1,900 km^{2})	18,248 (1900)	4,674	-74.39%	6.49
Rush	718 square miles (1,860 km^{2})	9,093 (1930)	2,956	-67.49%	4.12
Smith	897 square miles (2,320 km^{2})	16,384 (1900)	3,570	-78.21%	3.98
Stafford	795 square miles (2,060 km^{2})	12,510 (1910)	4,072	-67.45%	5.12
Washington	899 square miles (2,330 km^{2})	21,963 (1900)	5,530	-74.82%	6.15
Woodson	505 square miles (1,310 km^{2})	10,022 (1900)	3,115	-68.92%	6.17
Minnesota
Kittson	1,104 square miles (2,860 km^{2})	10,717 (1940)	4,207	-60.75%	3.81
Red Lake	432 square miles (1,120 km^{2})	12,195 (1900)	3,935	-67.73%	9.11
Missouri
Atchison	550 square miles (1,400 km^{2})	16,501 (1900)	5,305	-67.85%	9.65
Carroll	701 square miles (1,820 km^{2})	26,455 (1900)	8,495	-67.89%	12.12
Chariton	767 square miles (1,990 km^{2})	26,826 (1900)	7,408	-72.38%	9.66
Daviess	569 square miles (1,470 km^{2})	21,325 (1900)	8,430	-60.47%	14.82
Gentry	492 square miles (1,270 km^{2})	20,554 (1900)	6,162	-70.02%	12.52
Harrison	726 square miles (1,880 km^{2})	24,398 (1900)	8,157	-66.57%	11.24
Holt	470 square miles (1,200 km^{2})	17,083 (1900)	4,223	-75.28%	8.99
Knox	507 square miles (1,310 km^{2})	13,501 (1890)	3,744	-72.27%	7.38
Mercer	455 square miles (1,180 km^{2})	14,706 (1900)	3,538	-75.94%	7.78
Putnam	520 square miles (1,300 km^{2})	16,668 (1900)	4,681	-71.92%	9.00
Schuyler	308 square miles (800 km^{2})	11,249 (1890)	4,032	-64.16%	13.09
Scotland	439 square miles (1,140 km^{2})	13,232 (1900)	4,716	-64.36%	10.74
Shelby	502 square miles (1,300 km^{2})	16,167 (1900)	6,103	-62.25%	12.16
Sullivan	652 square miles (1,690 km^{2})	20,282 (1900)	5,999	-70.42%	9.20
Worth	267 square miles (690 km^{2})	9,832 (1900)	1,973	-79.93%	7.39
Montana
Carter	3,348 square miles (8,670 km^{2})	4,136 (1930)	1,415	-65.79%	0.42
Chouteau	3,997 square miles (10,350 km^{2})	17,191 (1910)	5,895	-65.71%	1.47
Daniels	1,426 square miles (3,690 km^{2})	5,553 (1930)	1,661	-70.09%	1.16
Garfield	4,847 square miles (12,550 km^{2})	5,368 (1920)	1,173	-78.15%	0.24
Golden Valley	1,176 square miles (3,050 km^{2})	2,126 (1930)	823	-61.29%	0.70
Judith Basin	1,871 square miles (4,850 km^{2})	5,238 (1930)	2,023	-61.38%	1.08
McCone	2,683 square miles (6,950 km^{2})	4,790 (1930)	1,729	-65.21%	0.64
Musselshell	1,871 square miles (4,850 km^{2})	12,030 (1930)	4,730	-60.68%	2.53
Petroleum	1,674 square miles (4,340 km^{2})	2,045 (1930)	496	-75.75%	0.30
Prairie	1,743 square miles (4,510 km^{2})	3,941 (1930)	1,088	-72.39%	0.62
Sheridan	1,706 square miles (4,420 km^{2})	13,847 (1920)	3,539	-74.44%	2.07
Treasure	984 square miles (2,550 km^{2})	1,990 (1920)	762	-61.71%	0.77
Wheatland	1,428 square miles (3,700 km^{2})	5,619 (1920)	2,069	-63.18%	1.45
Wibaux	890 square miles (2,300 km^{2})	3,113 (1920)	937	-69.90%	1.05
Nebraska
Arthur	718 square miles (1,860 km^{2})	1,412 (1920)	434	-69.26%	0.60
Banner	746 square miles (1,930 km^{2})	2,435 (1890)	674	-72.32%	0.90
Blaine	714 square miles (1,850 km^{2})	1,778 (1920)	431	-75.76%	0.60
Boone	687 square miles (1,780 km^{2})	14,738 (1930)	5,379	-63.50%	7.83
Boyd	545 square miles (1,410 km^{2})	8,826 (1910)	1,810	-79.49%	3.32
Clay	574 square miles (1,490 km^{2})	16,310 (1890)	6,104	-62.58%	10.63
Custer	2,576 square miles (6,670 km^{2})	26,407 (1920)	10,545	-60.07%	4.09
Dundy	921 square miles (2,390 km^{2})	5,610 (1930)	1,654	-70.52%	1.80
Fillmore	577 square miles (1,490 km^{2})	15,087 (1900)	5,551	-63.21%	9.62
Franklin	576 square miles (1,490 km^{2})	10,303 (1910)	2,889	-71.96%	5.02
Frontier	980 square miles (2,500 km^{2})	8,781 (1900)	2,519	-71.31%	2.57
Furnas	721 square miles (1,870 km^{2})	12,373 (1900)	4,636	-62.53%	6.43
Garden	1,731 square miles (4,480 km^{2})	5,099 (1930)	1,874	-63.25%	1.08
Gosper	463 square miles (1,200 km^{2})	5,301 (1900)	1,893	-64.29%	4.09
Greeley	571 square miles (1,480 km^{2})	8,685 (1920)	2,188	-74.81%	3.83
Harlan	574 square miles (1,490 km^{2})	9,578 (1910)	3,073	-67.92%	5.35
Hayes	713 square miles (1,850 km^{2})	3,603 (1930)	856	-76.24%	1.20
Hitchcock	718 square miles (1,860 km^{2})	7,269 (1930)	2,616	-64.01%	3.64
Keya Paha	774 square miles (2,000 km^{2})	3,594 (1920)	769	-78.60%	0.99
Logan	571 square miles (1,480 km^{2})	2,014 (1930)	716	-64.45%	1.25
Loup	571 square miles (1,480 km^{2})	2,188 (1910)	607	-72.26%	1.06
McPherson	860 square miles (2,200 km^{2})	2,470 (1910)	399	-83.85%	0.46
Nance	448 square miles (1,160 km^{2})	8,926 (1910)	3,380	-62.13%	7.54
Nuckolls	576 square miles (1,490 km^{2})	13,236 (1920)	4,095	-69.06%	7.11
Pawnee	433 square miles (1,120 km^{2})	11,770 (1900)	2,544	-78.39%	5.88
Richardson	555 square miles (1,440 km^{2})	19,826 (1930)	7,781	-60.30%	14.02
Rock	1,012 square miles (2,620 km^{2})	3,977 (1940)	1,262	-68.27%	1.25
Sherman	572 square miles (1,480 km^{2})	9,122 (1930)	2,959	-67.56%	5.17
Sioux	2,067 square miles (5,350 km^{2})	5,599 (1910)	1,135	-79.73%	0.55
Thayer	575 square miles (1,490 km^{2})	14,775 (1910)	4,913	-66.75%	8.54
Thomas	714 square miles (1,850 km^{2})	1,773 (1920)	669	-62.27%	0.94
Webster	575 square miles (1,490 km^{2})	12,008 (1910)	3,411	-71.59%	5.93
Wheeler	576 square miles (1,490 km^{2})	2,531 (1920)	774	-70.60%	1.34
New Mexico
Harding	2,126 square miles (5,510 km^{2})	4,421 (1930)	657	-85.14%	0.31
Mora	1,934 square miles (5,010 km^{2})	13,915 (1920)	4,189	-69.90%	2.17
Union	3,831 square miles (9,920 km^{2})	16,680 (1930)	4,079	-75.55%	1.06
North Dakota
Adams	989 square miles (2,560 km^{2})	6,343 (1930)	2,200	-65.32%	2.22
Billings	1,153 square miles (2,990 km^{2})	3,126 (1920)	945	-69.77%	0.82
Bottineau	1,697 square miles (4,400 km^{2})	17,295 (1910)	6,379	-63.12%	3.76
Burke	1,129 square miles (2,920 km^{2})	9,998 (1930)	2,201	-77.99%	1.95
Cavalier	1,510 square miles (3,900 km^{2})	15,659 (1910)	3,704	-76.35%	2.45
Divide	1,294 square miles (3,350 km^{2})}	6,015 (1910)	2,195	-63.51%	1.70
Eddy	644 square miles (1,670 km^{2})	6,493 (1920)	2,347	-63.85%	3.64
Emmons	1,555 square miles (4,030 km^{2})	12,467 (1930)	3,301	-73.52%	2.12
Golden Valley	1,002 square miles (2,600 km^{2})	4,832 (1920)	1,736	-64.07%	1.73
Grant	1,666 square miles (4,310 km^{2})	10,134 (1930)	2,301	-77.29%	1.38
Griggs	716 square miles (1,850 km^{2})	7,402 (1920)	2,306	-68.85%	3.22
Hettinger	1,134 square miles (2,940 km^{2})	8,796 (1930)	2,489	-71.70%	2.19
Kidder	1,433 square miles (3,710 km^{2})	8,031 (1930)	2,394	-70.19%	1.67
LaMoure	1,151 square miles (2,980 km^{2})	11,517 (1930)	4,093	-64.46%	3.56
Logan	1,011 square miles (2,620 km^{2})	8,089 (1930)	1,876	-76.81%	1.86
McHenry	1,912 square miles (4,950 km^{2})	17,627 (1910)	5,345	-69.68%	2.80
McIntosh	995 square miles (2,580 km^{2})	9,621 (1930)	2,530	-73.70%	2.54
Nelson	1,009 square miles (2,610 km^{2})	10,312 (1920)	3,015	-70.76%	2.99
Pembina	1,121 square miles (2,900 km^{2})	17,869 (1900)	6,844	-61.70%	6.11
Renville	893 square miles (2,310 km^{2})	7,840 (1910)	2,282	-70.89%	2.56
Sargent	867 square miles (2,250 km^{2})	9,655 (1920)	3,862	-60.00%	4.45
Sheridan	1,006 square miles (2,610 km^{2})	8,103 (1910)	1,265	-84.39%	1.26
Slope	1,219 square miles (3,160 km^{2})	4,940 (1920)	706	-85.71%	0.58
Steele	715 square miles (1,850 km^{2})	7,616 (1910)	1,798	-76.39%	2.51
Towner	1,041 square miles (2,700 km^{2})	8,963 (1910)	2,162	-75.88%	2.08
Wells	1,290 square miles (3,300 km^{2})	13,285 (1930)	3,982	-70.03%	3.09
Oklahoma
Alfalfa	881 square miles (2,280 km^{2})	18,138 (1910)	5,699	-68.58%	6.47
Beaver	1,818 square miles (4,710 km^{2})	14,048 (1920)	5,049	-64.06%	2.78
Coal	521 square miles (1,350 km^{2})	18,406 (1920)	5,266	-71.39%	10.11
Cotton	642 square miles (1,660 km^{2})	16,679 (1920)	5,527	-66.86%	8.61
Dewey	1,008 square miles (2,610 km^{2})	14,132 (1910)	4,484	-68.27%	4.45
Ellis	1,232 square miles (3,190 km^{2})	15,375 (1910)	3,749	-75.62%	3.04
Grant	1,004 square miles (2,600 km^{2})	18,760 (1910)	4,169	-77.78%	4.15
Greer	644 square miles (1,670 km^{2})	17,922 (1900)	5,491	-69.36%	8.53
Harmon	539 square miles (1,400 km^{2})	13,834 (1930)	2,488	-82.02%	4.62
Harper	1,041 square miles (2,700 km^{2})	8,189 (1910)	3,272	-60.04%	3.14
Jefferson	774 square miles (2,000 km^{2})	17,764 (1920)	5,337	-69.96%	6.90
Kiowa	1,031 square miles (2,670 km^{2})	29,630 (1930)	8,509	-71.28%	8.25
Okfuskee	629 square miles (1,630 km^{2})	29,016 (1930)	11,310	-61.02%	17.98
Roger Mills	1,146 square miles (2,970 km^{2})	14,164 (1930)	3,442	-75.70%	3.00
Seminole	640 square miles (1,700 km^{2})	79,621 (1930)	23,556	-70.41%	36.81
Tillman	879 square miles (2,280 km^{2})	24,390 (1930)	6,968	-71.43%	7.93
Washita	1,009 square miles (2,610 km^{2})	29,435 (1930)	10,924	-62.89%	10.83
South Dakota
Aurora	713 square miles (1,850 km^{2})	7,246 (1920)	2,747	-62.09%	3.85
Campbell	771 square miles (2,000 km^{2})	5,629 (1930)	1,377	-75.54%	1.79
Clark	967 square miles (2,500 km^{2})	11,136 (1920)	3,837	-65.54%	3.97
Day	1,091 square miles (2,830 km^{2})	15,194 (1920)	5,449	-64.14%	4.99
Douglas	434 square miles (1,120 km^{2})	7,236 (1930)	2,835	-60.82%	6.53
Faulk	1,006 square miles (2,610 km^{2})	6,895 (1930)	2,125	-69.18%	2.11
Gregory	1,054 square miles (2,730 km^{2})	13,061 (1910)	3,994	-69.42%	3.79
Hand	1,440 square miles (3,700 km^{2})	9,485 (1930)	3,145	-66.84%	2.18
Harding	2,678 square miles (6,940 km^{2})	4,228 (1910)	1,311	-68.99%	0.49
Hyde	866 square miles (2,240 km^{2})	3,690 {1930)	1,262	-65.80%	1.46
Jerauld	533 square miles (1,380 km^{2})	6,338 (1920)	1,663	-73.76%	3.12
Jones	971 square miles (2,510 km^{2})	3,177 (1930)	917	-71.14%	0.94
Lyman	1,707 square miles (4,420 km^{2})	10,848 (1910)	3,718	-65.73%	2.18
McPherson	1,152 square miles (2,980 km^{2})	8,774 (1930)	2,411	-72.52%	2.09
Mellette	1,311 square miles (3,400 km^{2})	5,293 (1930)	1,918	-63.76%	1.46
Miner	572 square miles (1,480 km^{2})	8,560 (1920)	2,298	-73.15%	4.02
Perkins	2,891 square miles (7,490 km^{2})	11,348 (1910)	2,835	-75.02%	0.98
Sanborn	570 square miles (1,500 km^{2})	7,877 (1920)	2,330	-70.42%	4.09
Spink	1,510 square miles (3,900 km^{2})	15,981 (1910)	6,361	-60.20%	4.21
Stanley	1,517 square miles (3,930 km^{2})	14,975 (1910)	2,980	-80.10%	1.96
Sully	1,070 square miles (2,800 km^{2})	3,852 (1930)	1,446	-62.46%	1.35
Texas
Briscoe	902 square miles (2,340 km^{2})	5,590 (1930)	1,435	-74.33%	1.59
Coleman	1,281 square miles (3,320 km^{2})	23,669 (1930)	7,684	-67.54%	6.00
Cochran	775 square miles (2,010 km^{2})	6,417 (1960)	2,547	-60.31%	3.29
Collingsworth	919 square miles (2,380 km^{2})	14,461 (1930)	2,652	-81.66%	2.89
Cottle	902 square miles (2,340 km^{2})	9,395 (1930)	1,380	-85.31%	1.53
Dickens	905 square miles (2,340 km^{2})	8,601 (1930)	1,770	-79.42%	1.96
Donley	933 square miles (2,420 km^{2})	10,262 (1930)	3,258	-68.25%	3.49
Eastland	932 square miles (2,410 km^{2})	58,565 (1920)	17,725	-69.73%	19.02
Edwards	2,120 square miles (5,500 km^{2})	3,768 (1910)	1,422	-62.26%	0.67
Fisher	902 square miles (2,340 km^{2})	13,565 (1930)	3,672	-72.93%	4.07
Foard	708 square miles (1,830 km^{2})	6,315 (1930)	1,095	-82.66%	1.55
Hall	904 square miles (2,340 km^{2})	16,966 (1930)	2,825	-83.35%	3.13
Hardeman	697 square miles (1,810 km^{2})	14,532 (1930)	3,549	-75.58%	5.09
Haskell	910 square miles (2,400 km^{2})	16,669 (1930)	5,416	-67.51%	5.95
Kent	903 square miles (2,340 km^{2})	3,851 (1930)	753	-80.45%	0.83
King	913 square miles (2,360 km^{2})	1,193 (1930)	265	-77.79%	0.29
Knox	855 square miles (2,210 km^{2})	11,368 (1930)	3,353	-70.50%	3.92
Loving	677 square miles (1,750 km^{2})	285 (1940)	64	-77.54%	0.09
Motley	990 square miles (2,600 km^{2})	6,812 (1930)	1,063	-84.40%	1.07
Red River	1,057 square miles (2,740 km^{2})	35,829 (1920)	11,587	-67.66%	10.96
Stonewall	920 square miles (2,400 km^{2})	5,667 (1930)	1,245	-78.03%	1.35
Terrell	2,358 square miles (6,110 km^{2})	3,189 (1950)	760	-76.17%	0.32
Throckmorton	915 square miles (2,370 km^{2})	5,253 (1930)	1,440	-72.59%	1.57
Wheeler	915 square miles (2,370 km^{2})	15,555 (1930)	4,990	-67.92%	5.45
Wyoming
Niobrara	2,628 square miles (6,810 km^{2})	6,321 (1920)	2,467	-60.97%	0.94

Sources:

- Population, percent change - April 1, 2020 (estimates base) to July 1, 2025, (V2025), accessed 10 June 2024;
- Census Bureau- County Population Census Counts 1900-90. accessed 24 May 2022

== See also ==
- Prairie madness
