= Frank J. Popper =

American academic (born 1944)

- Born: 1944 (age 81–82); Chicago, Illinois
- Education: Haverford College (BA); Harvard University (MPA); Harvard University (PhD)
- Scientific career
- Workplaces: Rutgers University, Princeton University

Frank J. Popper (born 1944) is an American academic who is a professor at the Edward J. Bloustein School of Planning and Public Policy of Rutgers University and the Princeton Environmental Institute at Princeton University, known for proposing the Buffalo Commons concept for the Great Plains region of the United States and coining the term locally unwanted land use (LULU).

== Personal life ==
Popper is the son of Hans Popper, the founding father of hepatology, and Lina Popper. He is married to Deborah Popper, with whom he co-authored his greatest works on Buffalo Commons and Shrinking Cities. He has two children, Joanna Popper and Nicholas Popper.

== Publications ==
- "Siting LULUs" (1981)
- "The Great Plains: From Dust to Dust" (1987), with Deborah E. Popper
