= Hans Popper =

Austrian physician (1903–1988)

Hans Popper (1903–1988)

Hans Popper (24 November 1903 – 6 May 1988) was an Austrian-born pathologist, hepatologist and teacher. Together with Dame Sheila Sherlock, he is widely regarded as the founding father of hepatology. He is the namesake of the Hans Popper Hepatopathology Society and the International Hans Popper Award.

== Early life ==
Popper was born to Carl and Emilie Popper in Vienna, Austria, on 24 November 1903. His father was a prominent physician and, as a captain in the medical corps, was called to active army duty at the outbreak of World War I. Hans Popper received a classical education at the Akademische Gymnasium and followed his father's footsteps by entering the Medical School of the University of Vienna in 1922 and graduating in 1928.

== Career ==
Popper spent his five postgraduate years in anatomical pathology and established a biochemical laboratory, which was a new field of medical research. He worked under the famous Viennese physician Professor Hans Eppinger, under whose influence he developed his interest in hepatology. One of his main achievements of this period was the creatinine clearance test to assess renal function. After Austria's Anschluß to the Third Reich in 1938, Popper (who was Jewish) narrowly escaped arrest by boarding a flight to Rotterdam, where he then boarded the SS New Amsterdam on her maiden voyage to New York. He received a research fellowship at the Cook County Hospital in Chicago and earned a Ph.D. in pathology at the University of Illinois. He held a succession of senior positions at this institution, including Director of Pathology. He became Scientific Director for the Hektoen Institute for Medical Research and Professor of Pathology at Northwestern University School of Medicine. He was the driving force behind the founding of the American Association for the Study of Liver Diseases, which first met in 1948. In 1957, he was appointed pathologist-in-chief at the Mount Sinai Hospital in New York, succeeding Paul Klemperer. There, he was pivotal in founding the Mount Sinai School of Medicine, becoming its first dean. In 1973, he became the Gustave L. Levy Distinguished Service Professor and maintained this position until his death.

== Publications ==
Popper authored and co-authored over 800 papers and 28 books, covering all areas of hepatology. Hans Popper: A Tribute, was written about Popper and released in 1991: ISBN 0881678333

== Personal life ==
Popper's parents managed to avoid Nazi persecution and joined him in Chicago. His father completed an internship and passed the Illinois State Board examination at the age of 77. Popper married a fellow expatriate, Lina Billig, in 1942. They had two sons, Frank J. Popper and Charles. Hans Popper died of pancreatic cancer on 6 May 1988.

== Honours ==
- 1928 MD, University of Vienna
- 1941 MS in Pathology, University of Illinois
- 1944 PhD in Pathology and Physiology, University of Illinois

== Honorary degrees ==
- 1965 MD (Hon), Catholic University of Leuven
- 1965 PhD (Hon), University of Vienna
- 1965 MD (Hon), University of Bologna
- 1974 MD (Hon), Medizinische Hochschule Hannover
- 1975 MD (Hon), University of Turin
- 1977 MD (Hon), University of Tübingen
- 1978 MD (Hon), Catholic University of Seoul
- 1979 DSc (Hon) The Mount Sinai School of Medicine, New York
- 1981 MD (Hon), University of Lisbon
- 1981 DSc (Hon), College of Medicine and Dentistry of New Jersey
- 1981 MD (Hon), University of Münster
- 1984 MD (Hon), University of Freiburg
- 1987 MD (Hon), University of Göttingen
- 1988 MD (Hon), The Humboldt University of Berlin (posthumously)

== Awards ==
- 1967 Fellow, American Academy of Arts and Sciences
- 1970 Distinguished Lecture Award, American College of Gastroenterology
- 1970 Charter Member, Alpha Omega Alpha Chapter at the Mount Sinai School of Medicine
- 1971 Julius Friedenwald Medal, American Gastroenterological Association
- 1974 Distinguished Service Award, International Association for the Study of the Liver
- 1976 Member, National Academy of Sciences
- 1976 Honorary Life Member, New York Academy of Sciences
- 1976 Gold Headed Cane Award, American Association of Pathologists and Bacteriologists
- 1976 Member, Deutsche Akademie der Naturforscher Leopoldina
- 1983 Distinguished Service Award, American Association for the Study of Liver Disease
- 1988 United States and Canadian Academy of Pathology Distinguished Pathologist Award (inaugural recipient)
