= Piblokto =

Culture-bound mental illness

Piblokto, also known as pibloktoq and Arctic hysteria, is a condition most commonly appearing in Inughuit (Northwest Greenlandic Inuit) societies living within the Arctic Circle. Piblokto is a culture-specific hysterical reaction in Inuit, especially women, who may perform irrational or dangerous acts, followed by amnesia for the event. Piblokto may be linked to repression of the personality of Inuit women. The condition appears most commonly in winter. It is considered to be a form of a culture-bound syndrome, although more recent studies (see Skepticism section) question whether it exists at all. Piblokto is also part of the glossary of cultural bound syndromes found in the Diagnostic and Statistical Manual of Mental Disorders (DSM-IV).

== History ==
Piblokto was first documented in 1892 and reports by European explorers describe the phenomenon as common to all Arctic regions. Explorers were the first to record piblokto in writing. Among these, Admiral Robert Peary provided a detailed look into the disorder during an expedition to Greenland. Peary and his men found the acts they witnessed among the Inuit women entertaining, and, having sent the women's male counterparts out on missions, became sexually involved with the remaining women. Piblokto is not limited to the indigenous people; reports of stranded sailors during the 1800s exhibiting the same symptoms have been found. The disorder is said to have existed before Western contact and still occurs today. However, as discussed below, many scholars now hold that culture-bound disorders may often be an artifact of colonial encounters, and contemporary discussions of piblokto in medical anthropology and cross-cultural psychiatry consider it to be an example of the suspect nature of culture-bound syndromes.

== Origin ==
Piblokto is most often found in but not confined to the Inughuit culture in the polar regions of northern Greenland. Similar symptoms have been reported in European sailors stranded in Arctic regions in the 1800s. Among the Inughuit, the attacks are not considered out of the ordinary. No native theory of the disorder is currently reported. This condition is most often seen in Inughuit women. Piblokto is most common during long Arctic nights.

== Symptoms ==
Piblokto is an abrupt dissociative episode with four phases: social withdrawal, excitement, convulsions and stupor, and recovery. In his book Handbook of Cultural Psychiatry, Wen-Shing Tseng provides the following example adapted from Foulks:

Mrs. A is a 30-year-old woman who has had periodic episodes of "strange experiences" in the past 3 years (since her mother's death). Three years ago, in the winter, during her first episode, she was acutely assaultive and tried to harm herself. The attack lasted about 15 min and she remembered nothing about it afterward. Two years ago, she had her second attack, which lasted about half an hour, during which time she ran from her home into the snow, tearing off her clothing.

== Causes ==
Although there is no known cause for piblokto, Western scientists have attributed the disorder to the lack of sun, the extreme cold, and the desolate state of most villages in the region. A cause for this disorder present in this culture may be the isolation of their cultural group.

This culture-bound syndrome is possibly linked to vitamin A toxicity (hypervitaminosis A). The native Inughuit diet or Eskimo nutrition provides rich sources of vitamin A through ingestion of the livers, kidneys, and fat of arctic fish and mammals and is possibly the cause or a causative factor. This causative factor is through the toxicity that has been reported for males, females, adults, children, and dogs. The ingestion of organ meats, particularly the livers of some Arctic mammals, such as the polar bear and bearded seal, in which the vitamin is stored at levels toxic to humans, can be fatal to most people.

Inughuit tradition states that it is caused by evil spirits possessing the living. Shamanism and animism are dominant themes in Inughuit traditional beliefs, with the angakkuq (healer) acting as a mediator with the supernatural forces. Angakkuit use trance states to communicate with spirits and carry out faith healing. There is a view among the Inughuit that individuals entering trance states should be treated with respect, given the possibility of a new "revelation" emerging as a result. Treatment in piblokto cases usually involves allowing the episode to run its course without interference. While piblokto can often be confused with other conditions (including epilepsy), in which failure to intervene can lead to the victim coming to harm, most cases tend to be benign.

== Skepticism ==
Although piblokto has a place in the historical record and official medical canons, a number of Arctic researchers and Arctic residents doubt its existence. The phenomenon, they suggest, may be more rooted in the experience and behavior of the early European explorers than the Inuit themselves.

In 1988 Parks Canada historian Lyle Dick began a substantial challenge to the concept that piblokto exists at all. Dick examined the original records of the European Arctic explorers, and ethnographic and linguistic reports on Inughuit societies, and discovered that not only is the majority of academic speculation into piblokto based on reports of only eight cases, but the word "piblokto" / "pibloktoq" does not exist within Inuktun (the Inughuit language); possibly, Dick concluded, this may have been the result of errors in phonetic transcription. In a 1995 paper published in the journal Arctic Anthropology, and in his 2001 book Muskox land: Ellesmere Island in the Age of Contact, Dick suggests that piblokto is a "phantom phenomenon", arising more from the Inuhuit reaction to European explorers in their midst.

Similarly, Hughes and Simons have described piblokto as a "catch-all rubric under which explorers lumped various Inuhuit anxiety reactions, expressions of resistance to patriarchy or sexual coercion, and shamanistic practice". Simply put, rather than understanding piblokto as a strange cultural phenomenon, some critical scholars now understand it to be an expression of trauma of colonial violence, including rape. For example, transcultural psychiatry scholar Laurence Kirmayer writes:

Most comprehensive psychiatric texts mention pibloktoq as a culture-bound syndrome characterized by sudden wild and erratic behaviour. Recently, the historian Lyle Dick collected all the published accounts of pibloktoq, of which there are only about 25. It seems that psychiatric case description transformed a situation of sexual exploitation of Inuit women by explorers into a discrete disorder worthy of a new diagnostic label. With hindsight, we can see how insensitivity to the impact of exploration on other peoples distorted the picture when vital information on social context was not included. The legacy of these colonialist blinkers is still with us ...

== See also ==
- Wendigo
- Cabin fever
- Kayak angst
- Prairie madness
- Menerik (sometimes meryachenie) (Note: Also spelled as meriachenie, meryacheniye, meryachenye, meriachen'e, meryachen'e, meriachenye, as well as emiryachenie, emiryachenye, emiriachen'e, emeryachenye, emeriachen'e, emiryachen'e, emiriachenie, emeryachenie.) – a condition similar to piblokto found in Siberia among Yakuts, Yukagirs, and Evenks. Sidorov and Davydov draw a distinction between piblokto-like menerik and latah-like meryachenie. Others use meryachenie as an umbrella term for both piblokto-like and latah-like states.
- Culture-bound syndrome
- Polar T3 syndrome
