= Cabin fever =

Irritability and restlessness upon isolated confinement for a long period of time

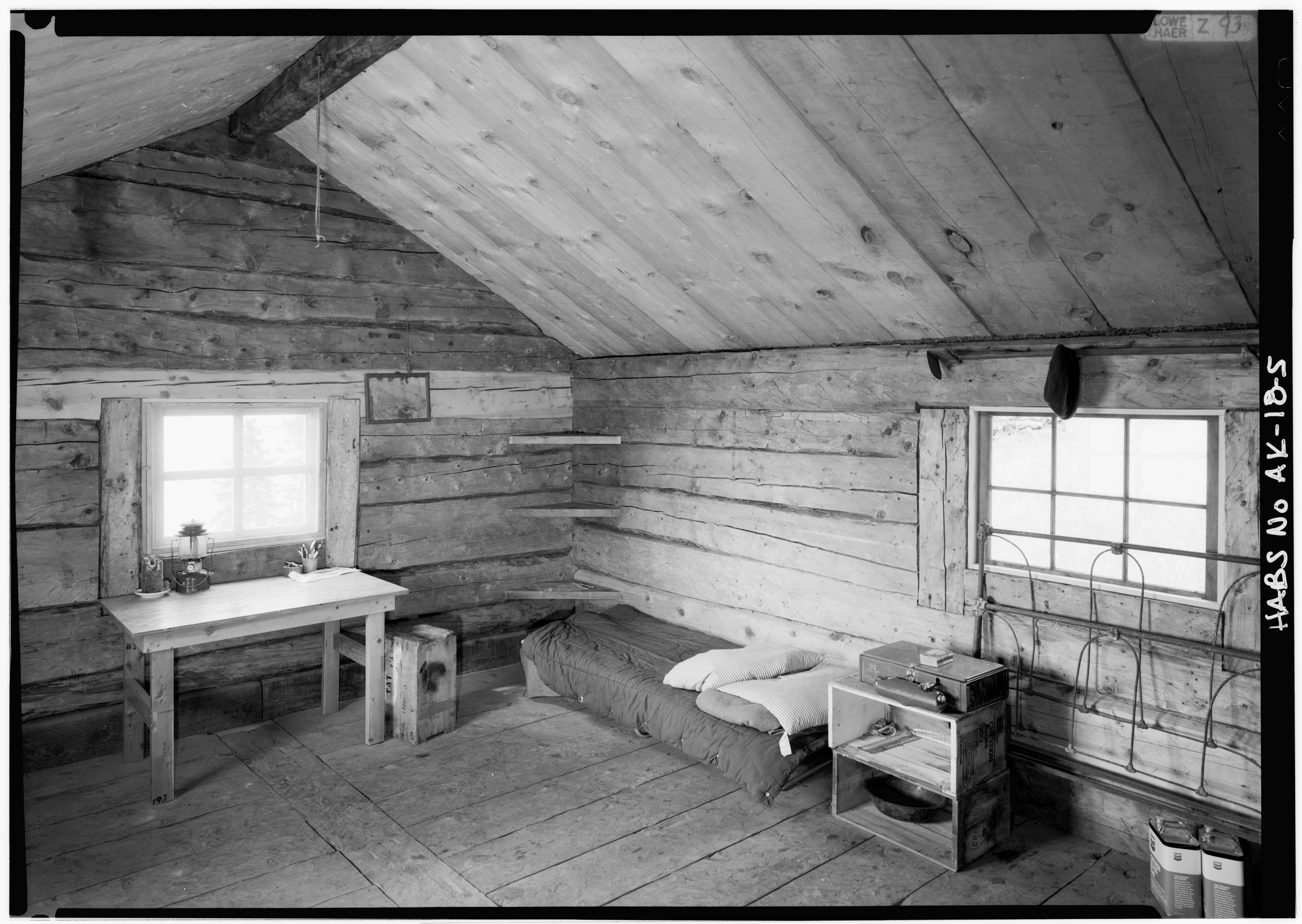
Interior of Fure's Cabin in Alaska, U.S.

Cabin fever is the distressing irritability or restlessness experienced when a person, or group, is stuck at an isolated location or in confined quarters for an extended time. A person may be referred to as stir-crazy, derived from the use of stir meaning "prison".

A person may experience cabin fever in a situation such as being isolated within a vacation cottage out in the countryside, spending long periods underwater in a submarine, or being otherwise isolated from civilization, for instance during a stay-at-home order or under martial law. During cabin fever, a person may experience sleepiness or sleeplessness, have a distrust of anyone they are with, or have an urge to go outside even in adverse conditions such as poor weather or limited visibility. The concept is also invoked humorously to indicate simple boredom from being home alone for an extended period of time.

Cabin fever itself is not a disease and there is no diagnosis. However, related symptoms can lead the sufferer to make irrational decisions that could potentially threaten their life or the life of the group with whom they are confined. Some examples would be suicide, paranoia, and reckless behavior such as leaving the safety of a cabin during a significant snowstorm.

== Therapy ==
One effective therapy for cabin fever involves engaging with nature. Research indicates that even short interactions with nature can enhance cognitive functioning, improve mood, and contribute to overall well-being. Escaping the confinement of the indoors and experiencing different scenery can assist individuals suffering from cabin fever in alleviating their mental distress. Exposure to the outdoors may stimulate both the brain and body, helping to mitigate feelings of claustrophobia, paranoia, and restlessness commonly associated with this condition.

There is little evidence of those suffering from cabin fever seeing therapists or counselors for treatment; most sufferers simply discuss their symptoms with family or friends as a way of coping with feelings of loneliness and boredom. However, there are cases of "cabin fever" that are diagnosed as mid-winter depression, or seasonal affective disorder (SAD).

== In popular culture ==
The concept of cabin fever was used as a theme in Fyodor Dostoevsky's 1866 novel Crime and Punishment, Chaplin's 1925 film The Gold Rush, Stefan Zweig's 1948 novella The Royal Game, the 2011 children's comedy book Diary of a Wimpy Kid: Cabin Fever, the 1980 horror film The Shining and The Simpsons episode "Mountain of Madness." In the 1996 film Muppet Treasure Island the crew of the Hispaniola sing a production number about succumbing to cabin fever. The 2019 psychological horror film The Lighthouse depicts the story of two lighthouse keepers who start to lose their sanity when a storm strands them on the remote island where they are stationed. The television show MythBusters had Adam and Jamie simulate a cabin fever scenario by isolating themselves in cabins in Alaska with no contact with the outside world and little stimuli. The hosts concluded that the myth of cabin fever was plausible since the hosts did develop some of the symptoms commonly associated with cabin fever, including irritability and excessive sleeping. The term has also been used for a franchise of horror films.

== See also ==
- Agoraphobia – Anxiety disorder
- Piblokto – Culture-bound mental illness
- Prairie madness – Mental suffering among settlers of the North American plains
- Quarantine – Epidemiological intervention to prevent disease transmission
- Wanderlust – Strong desire to travel the world
- Kayak angst – Anxiety associated with Inuit hunters
