= Rural flight =

Migrations from rural to urban areas

Urban vs rural majority

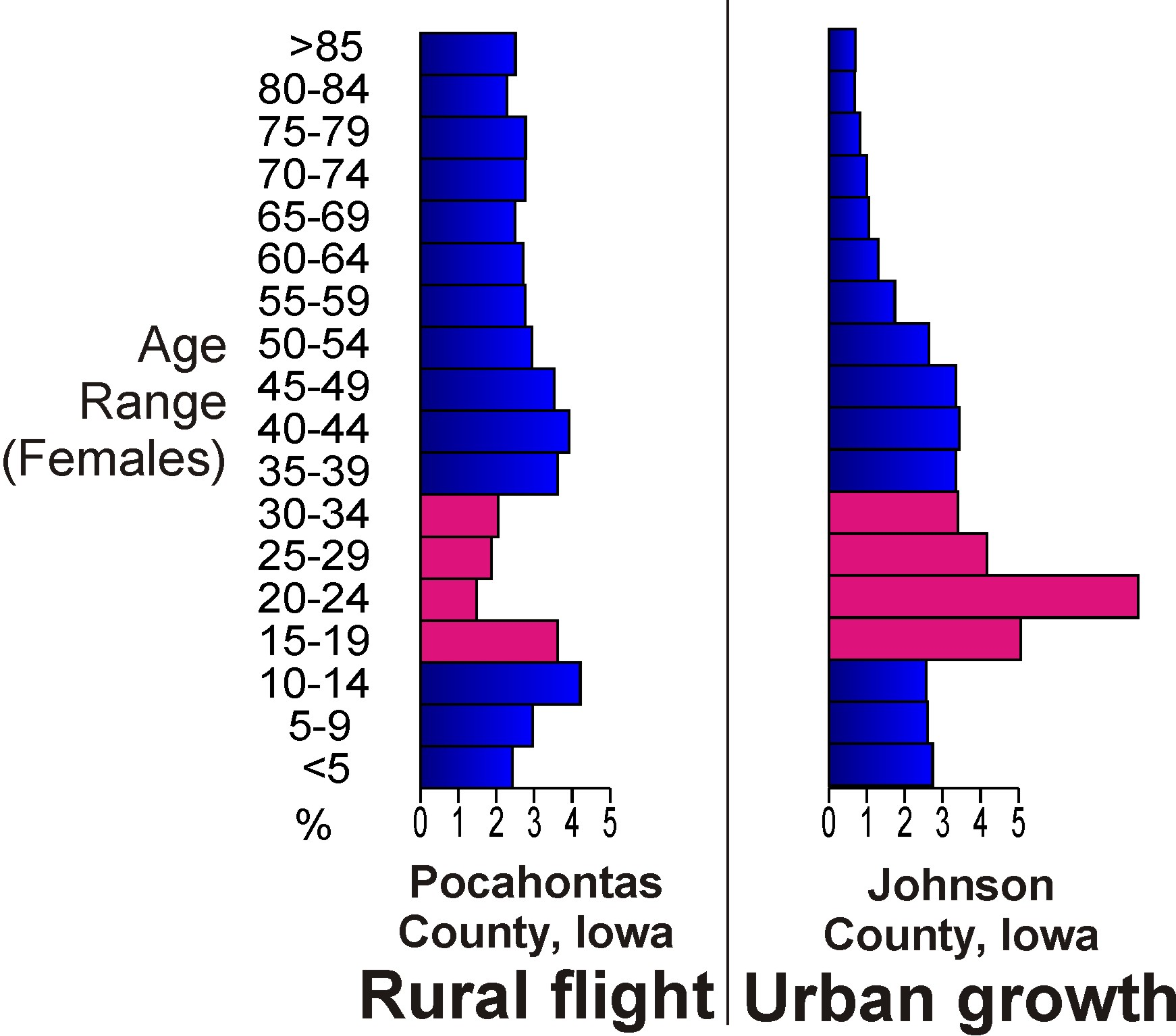
Population age comparison between rural Pocahontas County, Iowa, and urban Johnson County, Iowa, illustrating the flight of young female adults (red) to urban centers in Iowa

Rural flight (also known as rural-to-urban migration, rural depopulation, or rural exodus) is the migratory pattern of people from rural areas into urban areas. It is urbanization seen from the rural perspective. The pattern arises from an interplay of various push and pull factors and has occurred across history pushing states to employ multiple strategies to deal with the social and economic ramifications.

In industrializing economies like Britain in the eighteenth century or East Asia in the twentieth century, it can occur following the industrialization of primary industries such as agriculture, mining, fishing, and forestry—when fewer people are needed to bring the same amount of output to market—and related secondary industries (refining and processing) are consolidated. Rural exodus can also follow an ecological or human-caused catastrophe such as a famine or resource depletion. These are examples of push factors.

People can also move into town to seek higher wages, educational access and other urban amenities; examples of pull factors.

Once rural populations fall below a critical mass, the population is too small to support certain businesses, which then also leave or close, in a vicious circle. Services to smaller and more dispersed populations may be proportionately more expensive, which can lead to closures of offices and services, which further harm the rural economy. Schools are the archetypal example because they influence the decisions of parents of young children: a village or region without a school will typically lose families to larger towns that have one. But the concept (urban hierarchy) can be applied more generally to many services and is explained by central place theory.

Government policies to combat rural flight include campaigns to expand services to the countryside, such as electrification or distance education. Governments can also use restrictions like internal passports to make rural flight illegal. Economic conditions that can counter rural depopulation include commodities booms, the expansion of outdoor-focused tourism, and a shift to remote work, or exurbanization. To some extent, governments generally seek only to manage rural flight and channel it into certain cities, rather than stop it outright as this would imply taking on the expensive task of building airports, railways, hospitals, and universities in places with few users to support them, while neglecting growing urban and suburban areas.

In the 21st century states have adopted other strategies to counter this depopulation. They include Japan's akiya programs, Ireland’s refurbishment grants for island housing, and Greece’s relocation stipends in order to repopulate said regions. Others used migration (Canada’s Rural Community Immigration Pilot) which matched rural employers facing labor shortages with immigrants. Similarly, Romania also assists with housing and language learning.

== Historical trends ==
Prior to the Industrial Revolution, rural flight was usually localized. Pre-industrial societies did not experience large rural-urban migration flows primarily due to the inability of cities to support large populations. Lack of large employment industries, high urban mortality, and low food supplies all served as checks keeping pre-industrial cities much smaller than their modern counterparts. Ancient Athens and Rome, scholars estimate, had peak populations of 80,000 and 500,000.

The onset of the Industrial Revolution in Europe in the late 19th century removed many of these checks. As food supplies increased and stabilized and industrialized centers arose, cities began to support larger populations, sparking massive rural flight. This was often helped along by periodic agricultural recessions. The United Kingdom went from having 20% of the population living in urban areas in 1800 to more than 70% by 1925. While the late 19th century and early 20th century saw much of rural flight in Western Europe and the United States, industrialization spread throughout the world during the 20th century, and rural flight and urbanization followed quickly behind. In the early twenty-first century, rural flight was especially intense in China and sub-Saharan Africa.

=== Mechanization and ecology: case study of the Dust Bowl in 1930s North America ===
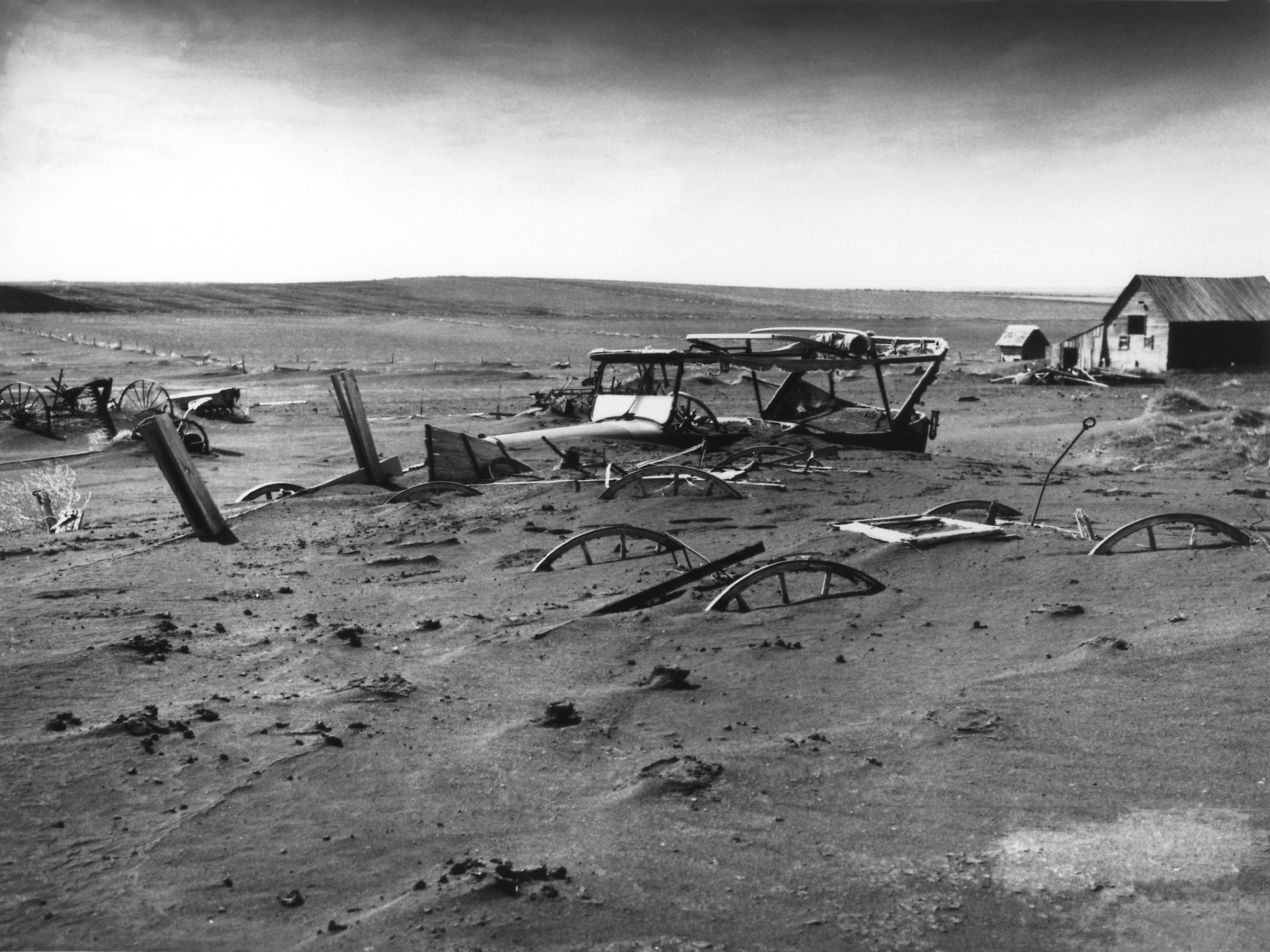
The effects of the Dust Bowl in Dallas, South Dakota, May 1936

The shift from mixed subsistence farming to commodity crops and livestock began in the late 19th century. New capital market systems and the railroad network began the trend towards larger farms that employed fewer people per acre. These larger farms used more efficient technologies such as steel plows, mechanical reapers, and higher-yield seed stock, which reduced human input per unit of production. The other issue on the Great Plains was that people were using inappropriate farming techniques for the soil and weather conditions. Most homesteaders had family farms generally considered too small to survive (under 320 acres), and European-American subsistence farming could not continue as it was then practiced.

During the Dust Bowl and the Great Depression of the 1930s, large numbers of people fled rural areas of the Great Plains and the Midwest due to depressed commodity prices and high debt loads exacerbated by several years of drought and large dust storms. Rural flight from the Great Plains has been depicted in literature, as in John Steinbeck's novel The Grapes of Wrath (1939), in which a family from the Great Plains migrates to California, fleeing the Dust Bowl.

=== Since World War II ===
"Women leave in greater numbers than men. There is a glass ceiling for women everywhere, but in rural areas it tends to be made of thick steel." Hiroya Masuda, author of Japanese report on rural depopulation.

Post-World War II rural flight has been caused primarily by the spread of industrialized agriculture. Small, labor-intensive family farms have grown into, or have been replaced by, heavily mechanized and specialized industrial farms. While a small family farm typically produced a wide range of crop, garden, and animal products—all requiring substantial labor—large industrial farms typically specialize in just a few crop or livestock varieties, using large machinery and high-density livestock containment systems that require a fraction of the labor per unit produced. For example, Iowa State University reports the number of hog farmers in Iowa dropped from 65,000 in 1980 to 10,000 in 2002, while the number of hogs per farm increased from 200 to 1,400.

The consolidation of the feed, seed, processed grain, and livestock industries has meant that there are fewer small businesses in rural areas. This decrease in turn exacerbated the decreased demand for labor. Rural areas that used to be able to provide employment for all young adults willing to work in challenging conditions, increasingly provide fewer opportunities for young adults. The situation is made worse by the decrease in services such as schools, business, and cultural opportunities that accompany the decline in population, and the increasing age of the remaining population further stresses the social service system of rural areas.

=== Abandonment of small towns ===
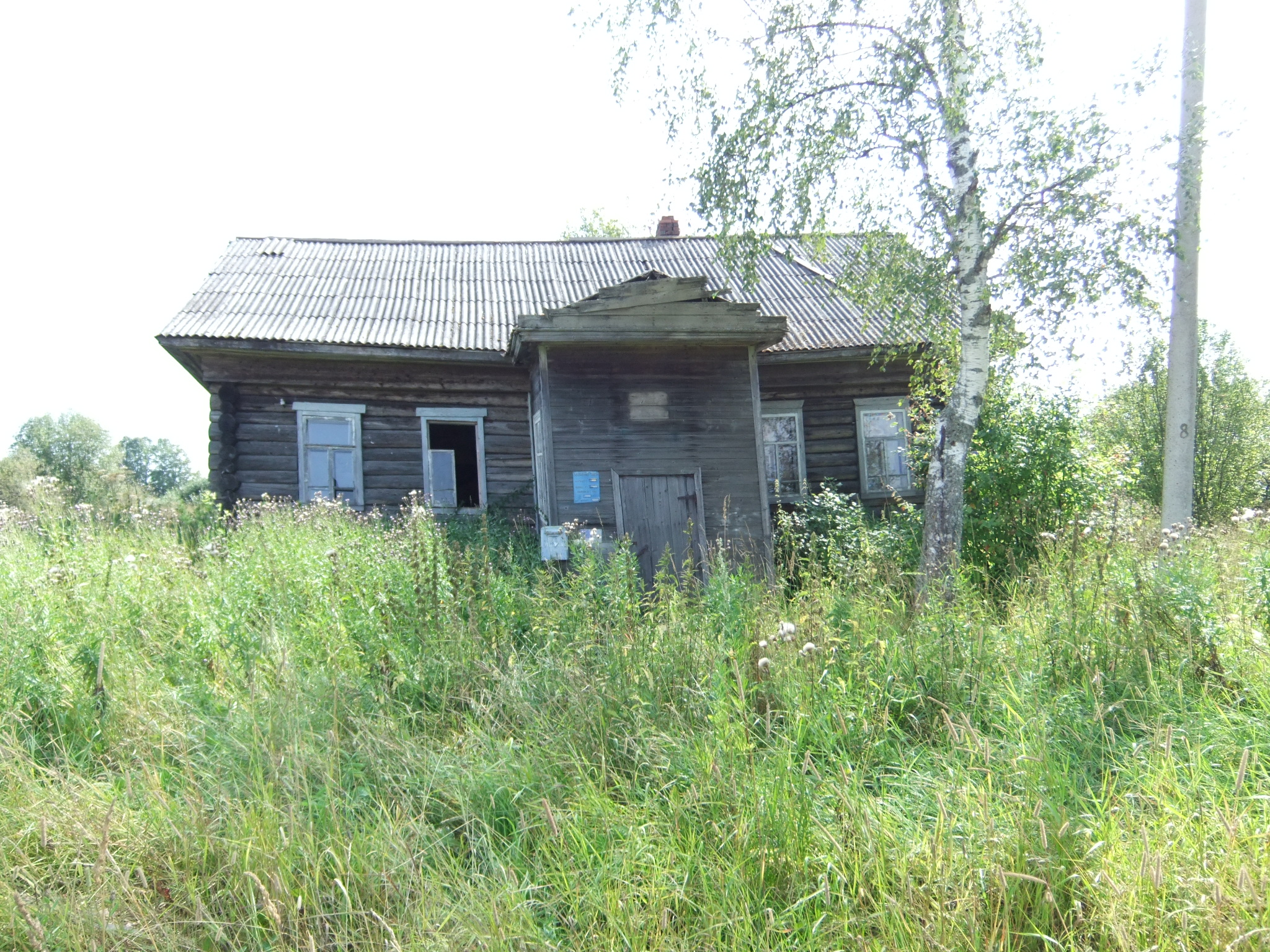
An abandoned post office in Menkovo, Yaroslavl Oblast, Russia

The rise of corporate agricultural structures directly affects small rural communities, resulting in decreased populations, decreased incomes for some segments, increased income inequality, decreased community participation, fewer retail outlets and less retail trade, and increased environmental pollution.

Since the 1990s, China has merged schools into more centralized village-, town-, or county-level schools in rural areas to address some of these very problems.

== Reasons for leaving ==
As with other human migration, various push and pull factors contribute to rural flight: lower levels of (perceived) economic opportunity in rural communities versus urban ones, lower levels of government investment in rural communities, greater education opportunities in cities, marriages, increased social acceptance in urban areas, and higher levels of rural fertility.

=== Economic motives ===
Some migrants choose to leave rural communities to pursue economic opportunity in urban areas. Greater economic opportunities can be real or perceived. According to the Harris-Todaro Model, migration to urban areas will continue as long as "expected urban real income at the margin exceeds real agricultural product" (127). However, sociologist Josef Gugler points out that while individual benefits of increased wages may outweigh the costs of migration, if enough individuals follow this rationale, it can produce harmful effects such as overcrowding and unemployment on a national level. This phenomenon, when the rate of urbanization outpaces the rate of economic growth, is known as overurbanization. With the rise of industrial agriculture, mechanization has reduced the number of jobs in rural communities.

Some scholars have also attributed rural flight to the effects of globalization as the demand for increased economic competitiveness leads people to choose capital over labor. At the same time, rural fertility rates have historically been higher than urban fertility rates. The combination of declining rural jobs and a persistently high rural fertility rate has led to rural-urban migration streams. Rural flight also contains a positive feedback loop where previous migrants from rural communities assist new migrants in adjusting to city life. Also known as chain migration, migrant networks lower barriers to rural flight. For example, an overwhelming majority of rural migrants in China located jobs in urban areas through migrant networks.

Some families choose to send their children to cities as a form of investment for the future. A study conducted by Bates and Bennett (1974) concluded that rural communities in Zambia that had other viable investment opportunities, like livestock for instance, had lower rates of rural-urban migration as compared to regions without viable investment opportunities. Sending their children into cities can serve as long-term investments with the hope that their children will be able to send remittances back home after getting a job in the city.

Poorer people face severe challenges in the agricultural sector because of diminishing access to productive farmland. Foreign investors through Foreign Direct Investment (FDI) schemes have been encouraged to lease land in rural areas in Cambodia and Ethiopia. This has led to the loss of farmland, range land, woodlands and water sources from local communities. Large-scale agricultural projects funded by FDI only employed a few experts specialized in the relevant new technologies.

=== Social motives ===
In other instances, rural flight may occur in response to social determinants. A study conducted in 2012 indicated that a significant proportion of rural flight in India occurred due to social factors such as migration with household, marriage, and education. Migration with households and marriage affect women in particular as most often they are the ones required to move with households and move for marriage, especially in developing regions.

Rural youth may choose to leave their rural communities as a method of transitioning into adulthood, seeking avenues to greater prosperity. With the stagnation of the rural economy and encouragement from their parents, rural youth may choose to migrate to cities out of social norms – demonstrating leadership and self-respect. With this societal encouragement combined with depressed rural economies, rural youth form a large proportion of the migrants moving to urban areas. In Sub-Saharan Africa, a study conducted by Touray in 2006 indicated that about 15% (26 million) of urban migrants were youth.

Lastly, natural disasters can often be single-point events that lead to temporarily massive rural-urban migration flows. The 1930s Dust Bowl in the United States, for example, led to the flight of 2.5 million people from the Plains by 1940, many to the new cities in the West. It is estimated that as many as one out of every four residents in the Plains States left during the 1930s. More recently, drought in Syria from 2006 to 2011 has prompted a rural exodus to major urban centers. Massive influxes in urban areas, combined with difficult living conditions, have prompted some scholars to link the drought to the arrival of the Arab Spring in Syria.

== Examples ==
=== United States and Canada ===
The terms are used in the United States and Canada to describe the flight of people from rural areas in the Great Plains and Midwest regions, and to a lesser extent rural areas of the northeast and southeast and Appalachia. It is also particularly noticeable in parts of Atlantic Canada (especially Newfoundland), since the collapse of Atlantic cod fishing fields in 1992.

Rural counties in the United States make up about 70 percent of the nation's land mass. Historically, population increase from births in rural areas more than compensated for the number of people moving from rural areas to urban areas, but from 2010 to 2016, rural areas lost population in absolute numbers for the first time.

=== China ===
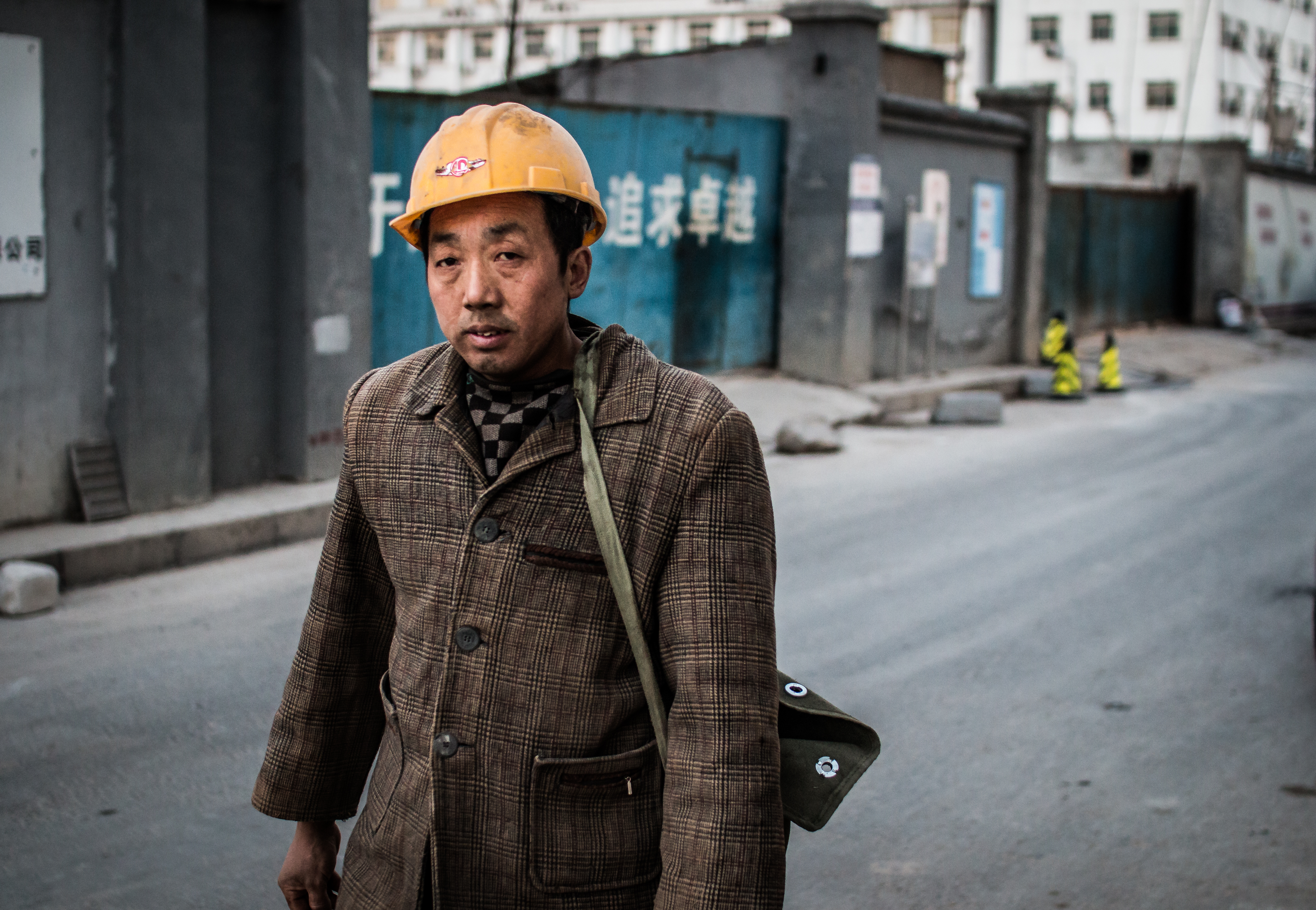
A Chinese migrant worker leaving the worksite after a shift in a city.

China, like many other currently industrializing countries, has had a relatively late start to rural flight. Until 1983, the Chinese government, through the hukou system, greatly restricted the ability of their citizens to internally migrate. Since 1983, the Chinese government has progressively lifted the restrictions on internal migration. This has led to a great increase in the number of people migrating to urban areas. However, even today, the hukou system limits the ability of rural migrants to receive full access to urban social services at the urban subsidized costs. As with most examples of rural flight, several factors have led towards China's massive urbanization. Income disparity, family pressure, surplus labor in rural areas due to higher average fertility rates, and improved living conditions all play a role in contributing to the flows of migrants from rural to urban areas. By the end of 2024, the country had an urbanization rate of 67% and is expected to reach 75–80% by 2035.

=== England and Wales ===
A focus by landowners on efficient production led to the enclosure of the commons in the 16th and 17th centuries. This created unrest in rural areas as tenants were then unable to graze their livestock. They sometimes resorted to illegal means to support their families. This was followed, in turn, by penal transportation which sent offenders out of the country, often Australia. Eventually, economic measures produced the British Agricultural Revolution.

=== Germany ===
==== Middle Ages ====
Rural flight has been occurring to some degree in Germany since the 11th century. A corresponding principle of German law is Stadtluft macht frei ("city air makes you free"), in longer form Stadtluft macht frei nach Jahr und Tag ("city air makes you free after a year and a day"): by custom and, from 1231/32, by statute, a serf who had spent a year and a day in a city was free, and could not be reclaimed by their former master.

==== German Landflucht ====
Landflucht ("flight from the land") refers to the mass migration of peasants into the cities that occurred in Germany (and throughout most of Europe) in the late 19th century.

In 1870 the rural population of Germany constituted 64% of the population; by 1907 it had shrunk to 33%. In 1900 alone, the Prussian provinces of East Prussia, West Prussia, Posen, Silesia, and Pomerania lost about 1,600,000 people to the cities, where these former agricultural workers were absorbed into the rapidly growing factory labor class; One of the causes of this mass-migration was the decrease in rural income compared to the rates of pay in the cities.

Landflucht resulted in a major transformation of the German countryside and agriculture. Mechanized agriculture and migrant workers, particularly Poles from the east (Sachsengänger), became more common. This was especially true in the province of Posen that was gained by Prussia when Poland was partitioned. The Polish population of eastern Germany was one of the justifications for the creation of the "Polish corridor" after World War I and the absorption of the land east of the Oder-Neisse line into Poland after World War II. Also, some labor-intensive enterprises were replaced by much less labor-intensive ones such as game preserves.

The word Landflucht has negative connotations in German, as it was coined by agricultural employers, often of the German aristocracy, who were lamenting their labor shortages.

=== Scotland ===
The rural exodus of Scotland followed that of England, but delayed by several centuries. Consolidation of farms and elimination of inefficient tenants occurred over about 110 years from the 18th to the 19th centuries. Samuel Johnson encountered this in 1773 and documented it in his work A Journey to the Western Islands of Scotland. He deplored the exodus but did not have the information to analyze the problem.

=== Sweden ===
Rural flight and out-migration in Sweden can be traced in two distinct waves. The first, beginning in the 1850s when 82% of the Swedish population lived in rural areas, and continuing till the late 1880s, was mostly due to push factors in the countryside related to poverty, unemployment, low agricultural wages, debt peonage, semi-feudalism, and religious oppression by the State church. Most of the migration was ad-hoc and directed towards emigration to the three big cities of Sweden, America, Denmark, or Germany. Many of these first emigrants were unskilled, barely literate laborers who sought farm work or daily wage labour in the cities.

The second wave started from the late 1890s and reached its peak between 1922 and 1967, with the highest rates of rural flight occurring in the 1920s and the 1950s. This was mostly "pull factors" due to the economic boom and industrial prosperity in Sweden wherein the massive economic expansion and wage increases in the urban areas pulled young people to migrate for work and at the same time drove down work opportunities in the countryside. Between 1925 and 1965, Sweden's GDP per capita increased from US$850 to US$6200. Simultaneously, the percentage of the population living in rural areas decreased drastically from 54% in 1925 to 21% in 1965.

=== Russia and the former Soviet states ===
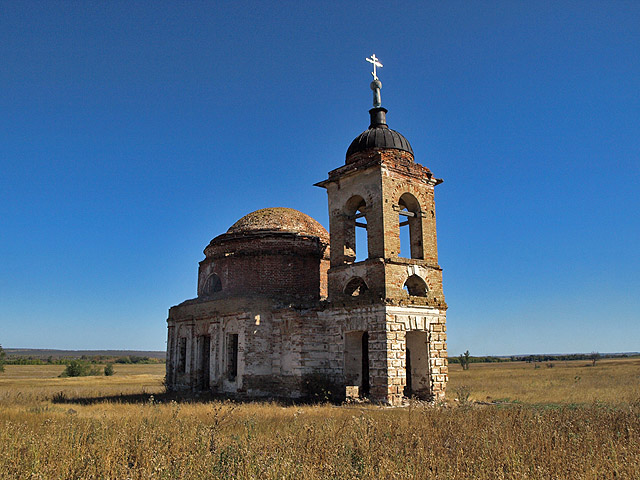
The defunct church in the abandoned village Novospasskoye, Saratov Oblast, Russia

Rural flight began later for the former states of the USSR than in Western Europe. In 1926 only 18% of Russians lived in urban areas, compared to over 75% at the same time in the United Kingdom. Although the process began later, throughout World War II and the decades immediately proceeding, rural flight proceeded at a rapid pace. By 1965, 53% of Russians lived in urban areas. Statistics compiled by M. Ya Sonin, a Soviet author, in 1959, demonstrate the rapid urbanization of the USSR. Between 1939 and 1959, the rural population declined by 21.3 million, while that of urban centers increased by 39.4 million. Of this dramatic shift in population, rural flight accounts for more than 60% of the change. Generally, most rural migrants tended to settle in cities and towns within their district. Rural flight persisted through the majority of the 20th century. However, with the end of the Soviet Union, rural flight reversed as political and economic instability in the cities prompted many urban dwellers to return to rural villages.

Rural flight did not occur uniformly throughout the USSR. Western Russia and the Ukraine experienced the greatest declines in rural population, 30% and 17% respectively. Conversely, peripheral regions of the USSR, like Central Asia, experienced gains, contradicting the general pattern of rural-urban migration of this period. Increased diversification of crops and labor shortages were primary contributors to the gains in rural population in the periphery.

Rural flight in Russia and the former USSR had several major determinants. The industrialization of agriculture, which came later in Russia and the former USSR, led to declines in available rural jobs. Lower living standards and tough work also motivated some peasants to migrate to urban areas. In particular, the Soviet kolkhoz system (the collective farms in the Soviet Union) aided in maintaining low living standards for Soviet peasants. Beginning around 1928, the kolkhoz system replaced family farms throughout the Soviet Union. Forced to work long hours for low pay at rates fixed by the government and often unadjusted to inflation, Russian peasants experienced quite low living-conditions - especially compared to urban life. While Brezhnev's wage reforms in 1965 ameliorated the low wages received by peasants, rural life remained suffocating, especially for the skilled and the educated.

Although migrants came from all segments of society, several groups were more likely to migrate than others. Like other examples of rural flight, the young were more likely than the old to migrate to the cities. Young women under 20 were the most likely segment of the population to leave rural life. This exodus of young women further exacerbated the demographic transitions occurring in rural communities as the rate of natural increase dropped precipitously over the course of the 20th century. Lastly, the skilled and educated were also likely to migrate to urban areas.

=== Mexico ===
Rural flight in Mexico occurred throughout the 1930s up until the present day. Like other developing nations, the beginning of industrialization in Mexico quickly accelerated the rate of rural flight.

In the 1930s, President Cardenas implemented a series of agricultural reforms that led to massive redistribution of agricultural land among the rural peasants. Some commentators have subsequently dubbed the period from 1940 to 1965 as the "Golden Era for Mexican Migration." During this period, Mexican agriculture grew at an average rate of 5.7% outpacing the natural increase of 3% of the rural population. Concurrently, government policies favoring industrialization led to a massive increase of industrial jobs in the cities. Statistics compiled in Mexico City demonstrate this trend with over 1.8 million jobs created over the course of the 1940s, 1950s, and 1960s. Young people with schooling were the segment of population most likely to migrate away from rural life to urban life, attracted by the promise of many jobs and a more modern lifestyle as compared to the conservative conditions in rural villages. Additionally, due to the large demand for new workers, many of these jobs had low entrance requirements that also provided on-site job training opening the avenue for migration to many rural residents. From 1940 to about 1965, rural flight occurred in a slow, yet steady pace with both agriculture and industry growing concurrently.

However, as government policies increasingly favored industry over agriculture, rural conditions began to deteriorate. In 1957, the Mexican government began to regulate the price of maize through massive imports in order to keep low urban food costs. This regulation severely undercut the market price of maize lowering the profit margins of small farmers. At the same time, the Green Revolution had entered into Mexican agriculture. Inspired by the work of Norman Borlaug, farmers that employed hybrid seeds and fertilizer supplements were able to double or even triple their yields per acre. Unfortunately, these products came at a relatively high cost, out of the reach of many farmers struggling after the devaluation of the price of maize. The combined effects of the maize price regulation and the Green Revolution was the consolidation of small farms into larger estates. A 1974 study conducted by Osorio concluded that in 1960, about 50.3% of the individual land plots in Mexico contained less than 5 hectares of land. In contrast, the top 0.5% of estates by land spanned 28.3% of all arable land. As many small farmers lost land, they either migrated to the cities or became migrant workers roving from large estate to large estate. Between 1950 and 1970, the proportion of migrant workers increased from 36.7% to 54% of the total population. The centralized pattern of industrial development and government policies overwhelmingly favoring industrialization contributed to massive rural flight in Mexico beginning in the late 1960s until the present day.

== Consequences of rural flight ==
Rural migrants to cities face several challenges that may hinder their quality of life upon moving into urbanized areas. Many migrants do not have the education or skills to acquire decent jobs in cities and are then forced into unstable, low paying jobs. The steady stream of new rural migrants worsens underemployment and unemployment, common among rural migrants. Employers offer lower wages and poorer labor conditions to rural migrants, who must compete with each other for limited jobs, often unaware of their labor rights. Rural migrants often experience poor living conditions as well. Many cities have exploded in population; services and infrastructure, in these cities, are unable to keep up with population growth. Massive influxes in rural population can lead to severe housing shortages, inadequate water and energy supply, and general slum-like conditions throughout cities.

Additionally, rural migrants often struggle adjusting to city life. In some instances, there are cultural differences between the rural and urban areas of a region. Lost in urban regions, it becomes difficult for them to continue holding onto their cultural traditions. Urban residents may also look down upon these newcomers to the city who are often unaware of city social norms. Both marginalized and separated from their home cultures, migrants face many social challenges when moving to cities.

Women, in particular, face a unique set of challenges. Some women undergo rural flight to escape domestic abuse or forced early marriages. Some parents choose to send women to cities to find jobs in order to send remittances back home. Once in the city, employers may attempt to take advantage of these women preying on their unfamiliarity with labor laws and social networks on which to rely. In the worst of cases, destitution may force women into prostitution, exposing them to social stigma and the risks of sexually transmitted diseases.

== See also ==
- Counterurbanization
- Demographic history of the United States
- Highland Clearances
- Rural development
- Rural ghetto
- Rural sociology
- Unpromising villages
