= Stadtluft macht frei =

German saying describing a principle of law in the Middle Ages

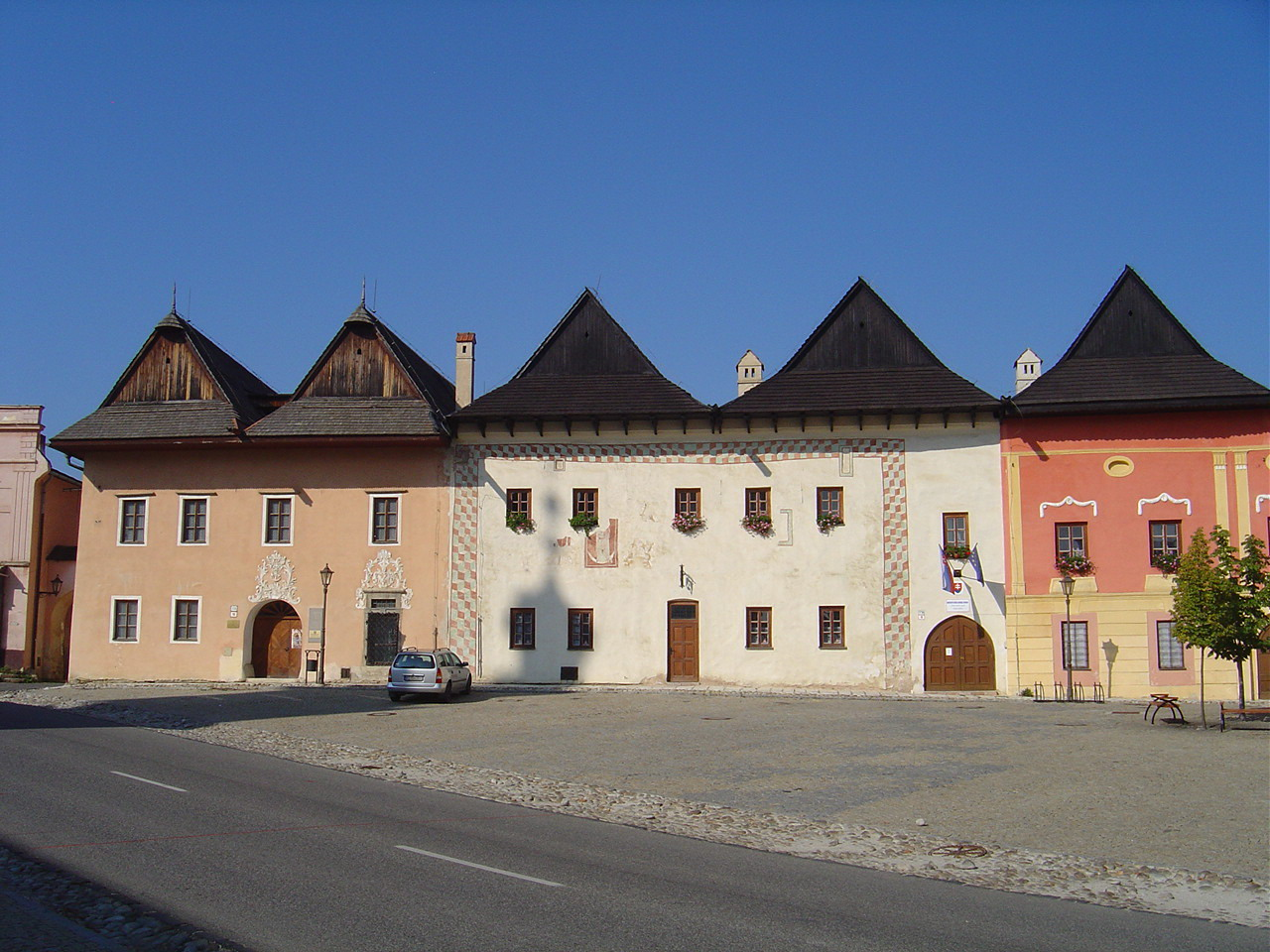
Medieval square in Spišská Sobota (Slovakia)

Stadtluft macht frei ("urban air makes you free"), or Stadtluft macht frei nach Jahr und Tag ("city air makes you free after a year and a day"), is a German saying describing a principle of law in the Middle Ages. The period of a year and a day was a conventional period widely employed in Europe to represent a significant amount of time.

From the 11th century onwards, liberated serfs and other members of the Third Estate founded settlements alongside the old Roman or Germanic ones. It was customary law that a city resident was free after one year and one day. After this he could no longer be reclaimed by his employer and thus became bound to the city. Serfs could flee the feudal lands and gain freedom in this way, making cities a territory outside the feudal system to a certain extent. This created the conditions for revolts such as the Münster Rebellion.

With the Statutum in favorem principum ("Statute in Favor of the Princes"), this regulation of customary law was officially abolished for the Holy Roman Empire in 1231/32. According to the statute, cities under royal jurisdiction were forbidden to protect serfs originally owned by the regional princes or their vassals. The statute is an example of power devolving from Imperial authority to that of territorial magnates during the drawn-out contest between the Hohenstaufen emperors and the Papacy.

The medieval concept of liberty was largely confined to traditional collective rights and privileges based in custom and precedent and often expressed in territorial liberties such as, to take English examples, the Liberties of the Tower of London or the Liberties of the Savoy. Historically, the development of individualism is a product of the ideology of liberalism, whose emphasis on modern individual liberties and freedom emerged in opposition to authoritarian oppression, in England culminating in the Glorious Revolution of 1688, and in France surfacing during the French Revolution.

== See also ==
- "The air of England is too pure for a slave to breathe"
- Landflucht
