= Prairie madness =

Mental suffering among settlers of the North American plains

Iowa prairie, 1903

Prairie madness or prairie fever was an affliction that affected European settlers in the Great Plains during their migration to, and settlement of, the Canadian Prairies and the Western United States in the 19th century. Settlers moving from urbanized or relatively settled areas in the East faced the risk of mental breakdown caused by the harsh living conditions and the extreme levels of isolation on the prairie. Symptoms of prairie madness included depression, withdrawal, changes in character and habit, and violence. Prairie madness sometimes resulted in the afflicted person moving back East or, in extreme cases, suicide.

Prairie madness is not a clinical condition; rather, it is a pervasive subject in writings of fiction and non-fiction from the period to describe a fairly common phenomenon. It was described by Eugene Virgil Smalley in 1893: "an alarming amount of insanity occurs in the new Prairie States among farmers and their wives."

== Causes ==
Prairie madness was caused by the isolation and tough living conditions on the prairie. The level of isolation depended on the topography and geography of the region. Most examples of prairie madness come from the Great Plains region. One explanation for these high levels of isolation was the Homestead Act of 1862. This act stipulated that a person would be given a tract of 160 acres if they were able to live on it and make something out of it in a five-year period. The farms of the Homestead Act were at least half a mile apart, but usually much more. Although there were thriving Indigenous nations and communities, there was little settlement of Europeans on the Plains and settlers had to be almost completely self-sufficient.

The lack of quick and easily available transportation was also a cause of prairie madness; settlers were far apart from one another and they could not see their neighbors or get to town easily. In many areas, towns were usually located along the railroads and 10–20 miles (16–32 km) apart—close enough for people to bring their goods to market within a day's travel, but not close enough for most people to see town on more than an infrequent basis. This particularly applied to women who were often left behind to tend to family and farm while the men went to town. Those who had family back on the East Coast could not visit their families without embarking on a long journey. Settlers were very alone. This isolation also caused problems with medical care; it took such a long time to get to the farms that when children fell sick they frequently died. This caused significant trauma for the parents, and contributed to prairie madness.

Another major cause of prairie madness was the harsh weather and environment of the Plains, including long, cold winters filled with blizzards followed by short, hot summers. Once winter came, it seemed that all signs of life such as plants and animals had disappeared. Farmers would be stuck in their houses under several feet of snow when the blizzards struck, and families would be cramped inside for days at a time. There were few trees, and the flat land stretched out for miles and miles. Some settlers specifically spoke of the wind that rushed through the prairie, which was loud, forceful, and alien compared to what settlers had experienced in their former lives.

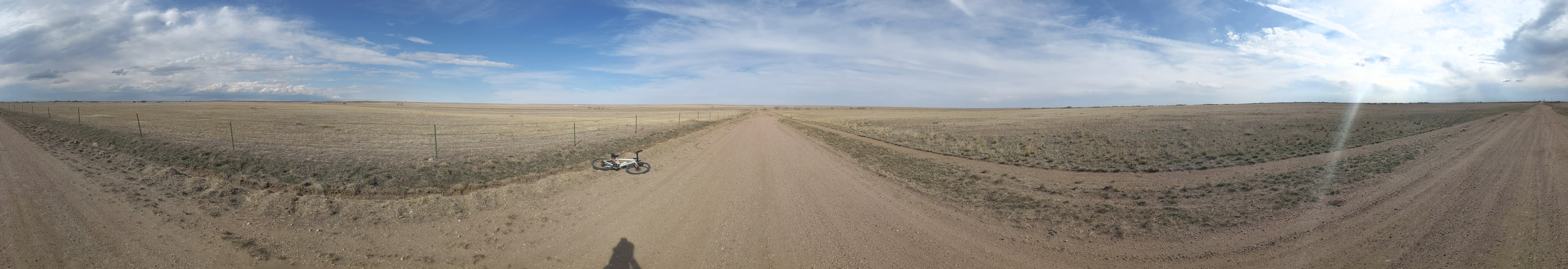
Panorama of the flat Northern Colorado prairie. The landscape is desolate and dry between late summer (August) and spring (April), for around 8 months per year.

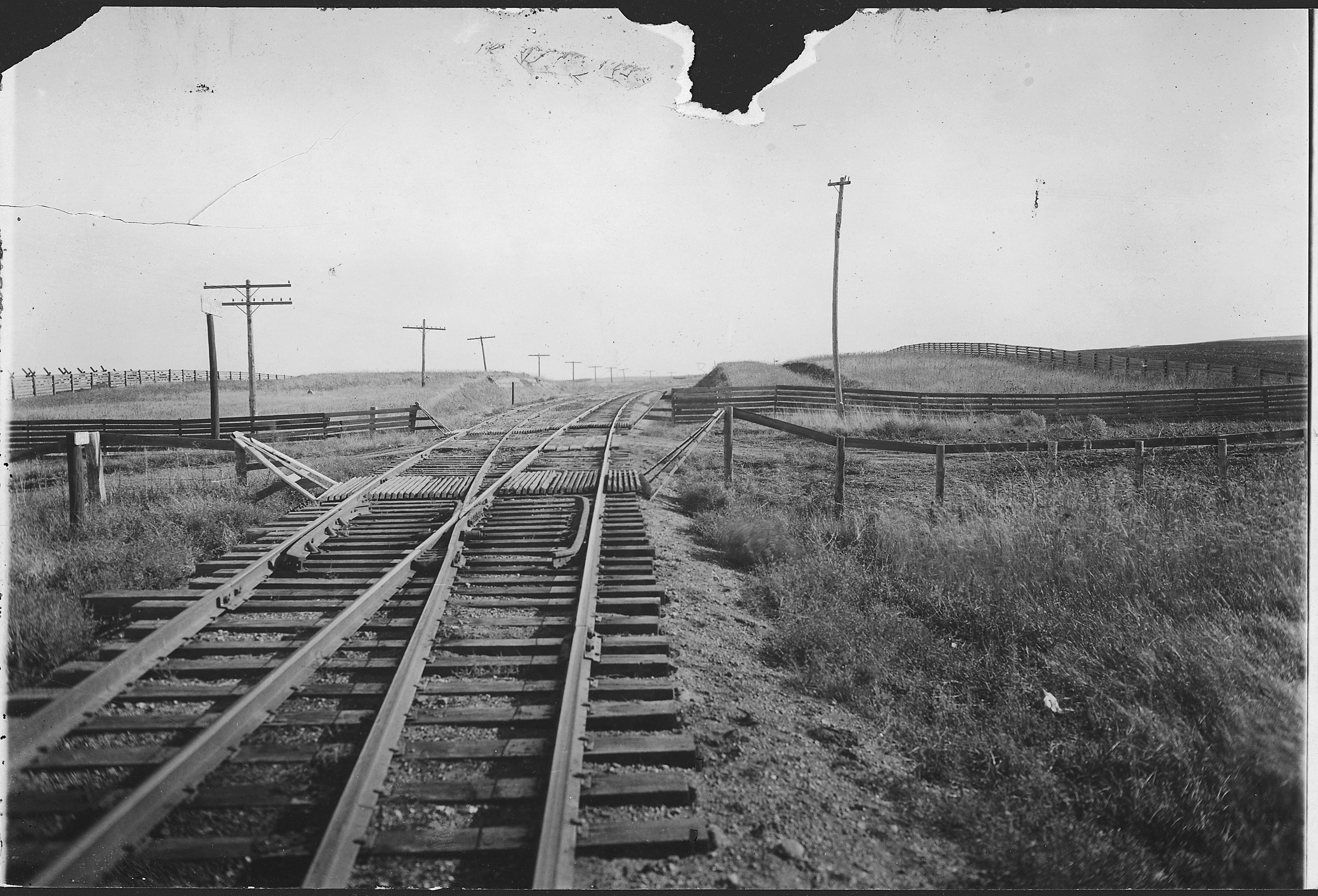
Railroad crossing with cattle guards in rural South Dakota

== Risk factors ==
Many stayed very attached to their way of life back East, and their attempts to make their new homes in the West adhere to the old ways sometimes triggered prairie madness. Others tried to adapt to the entirely new way of life, and abandoned the old ways, but still fell victim to madness. Some coping mechanisms to escape the emotional trauma of moving to the prairie was to continually move around to new locations, or to move back East.

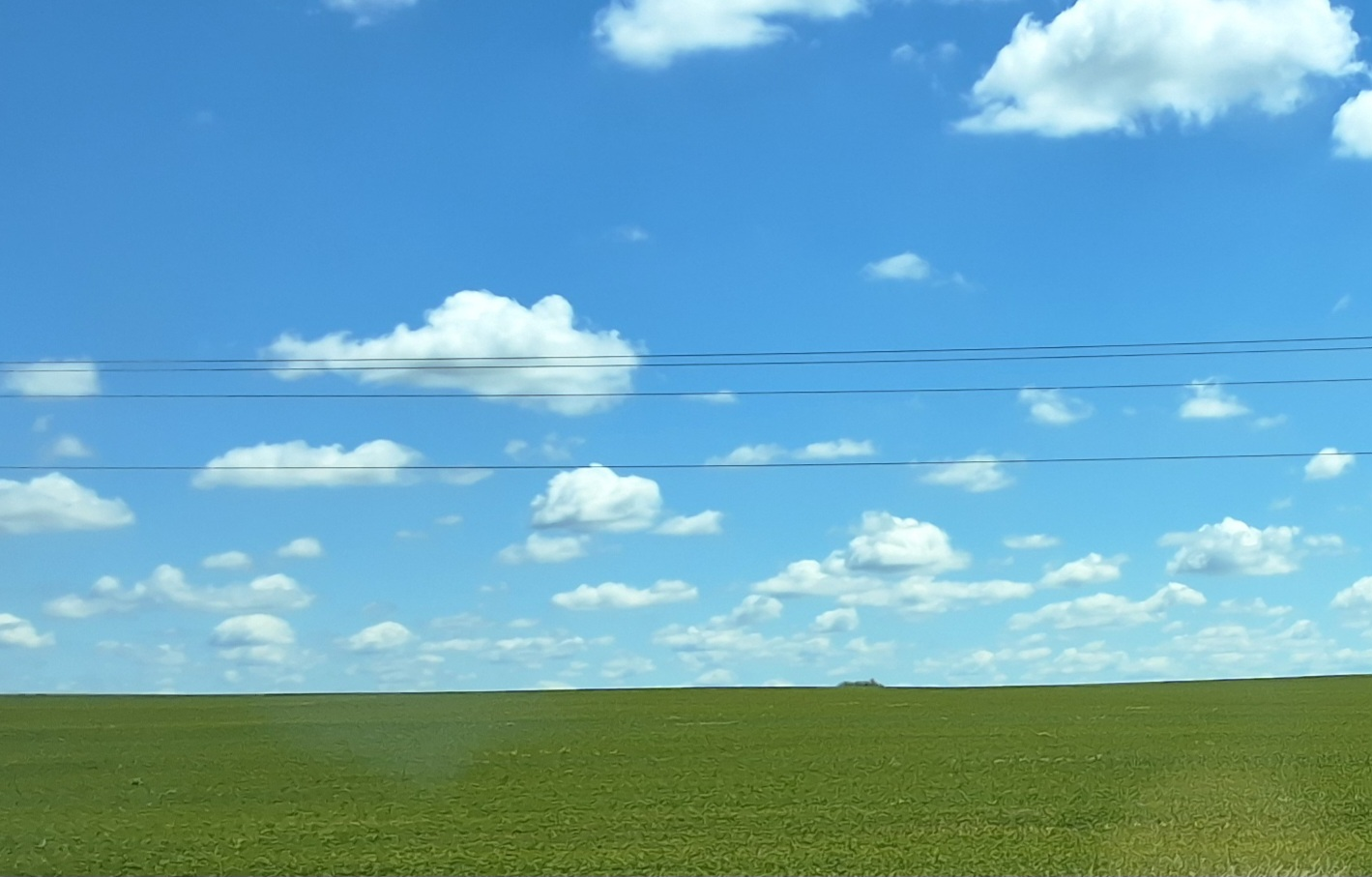
Landscape in Iowa where the land meets the sky with no trees.

Immigrants were particularly at risk for prairie madness. Immigrant families not only had to suffer from isolation, but the settlers who lived in their area often had different languages and customs. As such, this was an even further separation from society. Immigrant families were also hard-hit by prairie madness because they came from communities in Europe that were very close-knit small villages, and life on the prairie was a terrible shock for them.

There is a debate between scholars as to whether the condition affected women more than men, although there is documentation of both cases in both fiction and non-fiction from the nineteenth century. Women and men each had different manifestations of the disease, women turning towards social withdrawal and men to violence.

A flat landscape near Shickley, Nebraska, 1948

== Symptoms ==
Since prairie madness does not refer to a clinical term, there is no specific set of symptoms of the affliction. However, the descriptions of prairie madness in historical writing, personal accounts, and Western literature elucidate what some of the effects of the affliction were.

The symptoms of prairie madness were similar to those of depression. The women affected by prairie madness were said to show symptoms such as crying, slovenly dress, and withdrawal from social interactions. Men also showed signs of depression, which sometimes manifested in violence. Prairie madness was not unique from other types of depression, but the harsh conditions on the prairie triggered this depression, and it was difficult to overcome without getting off the prairie.

In extreme cases, the depression would lead to mental breakdown. This could lead to suicide. There are theories that the suicides caused by prairie madness were typically committed by women, and performed in an exhibitionist fashion.

== Decline ==
Prairie madness virtually disappears from the historical and literary record during the 20th century. This was likely the result of new modes of communication and transportation that arose during the late 19th and early 20th century. These included the increase in railroad lines, the invention and increasing usage of both the telephone and automobile, and further settlement leading to the "closing of the frontier", as described by renowned American Western historian Frederick Jackson Turner.

== Cultural impact ==
- Dakota author Gabrielle Wynde Tateyuskanskan explores prairie madness as a settler colonial phenomenon, contrasted with Native Americans's connection to the land. In "Shadows of Voices", a poem commemorating the memorial march for Dakota genocide victims, she writes: "Shadows of voices sustain memory in the continuous prairie wind. / Okiya from sacred and wise relatives. / This same prairie wind that caused pioneer women to go mad."
- Stephen Bridgewater directed a 2008 American Western film, Prairie Fever, starring Kevin Sorbo, Lance Henriksen and Dominique Swain.
- The Homesman is a 2014 Western historical drama film set in the 1850s Midwest, based the screenplay on the 1988 novel of the same name by Glendon Swarthout. The fictional story depicts one woman taking on the daunting task of transporting back to city life three other women suffering from prairie madness.
- Michael Parker wrote a novel called Prairie Fever in 2019.

== See also ==
- Agoraphobia – Anxiety disorder
- Cabin fever – Irritability and restlessness upon isolated confinement for a long period of time
- Kayak angst – Anxiety associated with Inuit hunters
- Piblokto – Culture-bound mental illness
- Depopulation of the Great Plains – Large-scale migration of people from rural areas
- Great American Desert – Historical term for the High Plains region of North America
