= Prairie Fever =

2008 American film

- VHS cover
- Directed by: Stephen Bridgewater; David S. Cass Sr.
- Written by: Steven H. Berman
- Produced by: H. Daniel Gross; Michael Moran
- Starring: Kevin Sorbo; Lance Henriksen; Dominique Swain
- Cinematography: Al López
- Edited by: Jennifer Jean Cacavas
- Music by: Joe Kraemer
- Production companies: Grand Army Entertainment; Larry Levinson Productions
- Distributed by: Blockbuster
- Release date: March 29, 2008
- Running time: 81 minutes
- Country: United States
- Language: English

Prairie Fever is a 2008 American Western direct-to-video film directed by Stephen Bridgewater. It stars Kevin Sorbo, Lance Henriksen and Dominique Swain.

== Plot ==
Preston Biggs, former sheriff of Clearwater, escorts three women suffering from prairie fever to Carson City: Lettie tried to kill her husband; Abigale, too fragile for prairie life; and Bible-quoting Blue just snapped on her farm. They are joined by a gambler named Olivia. A gang of outlaws is chasing them.

== Cast ==
- Kevin Sorbo as Sheriff Preston Biggs
- Lance Henriksen as Monte James
- Dominique Swain as Abigail
- Jamie Anne Allman as Olivia Thibodeaux
- Jillian Armenante as Lettie
- Felicia Day as "Blue"
- Lucy Lee Flippin as Faith
- Robert Norsworthy as The Bartender
- Blake Gibbons as Charlie
- Don Swayze as James
- Richard Clarke Larsen as Carson City Hotel Clerk
- Silas Weir Mitchell as Frank
- Ken Magee as Homer
- Chris McKenna as Sheriff Logan
- E.E. Bell as Luke

== Production ==
The film is Sorbo's first Western. The film has been described as a "medium-budget Western".

== Reception ==
Radio Times reviewed the film: "In this clichéd western, [Sorbo] plays a drunken ex-lawman who's asked to escort three troubled mail-order brides across harsh terrain. These so-called 'prairie fever'-afflicted women (among them a showy Dominique Swain) give an unusual slant to an otherwise archetypal mix of characters and events, but frustratingly the plotline only deals superficially with the roots of their anguish." The Video Source book gave the film two stars out of 5 The film has been called a "period Western with the traditional good guys and varmints." A brief review at Dove found it unusual and appropriate for family-audiences.
