= Kayak angst =

Anxiety associated with Inuit hunters

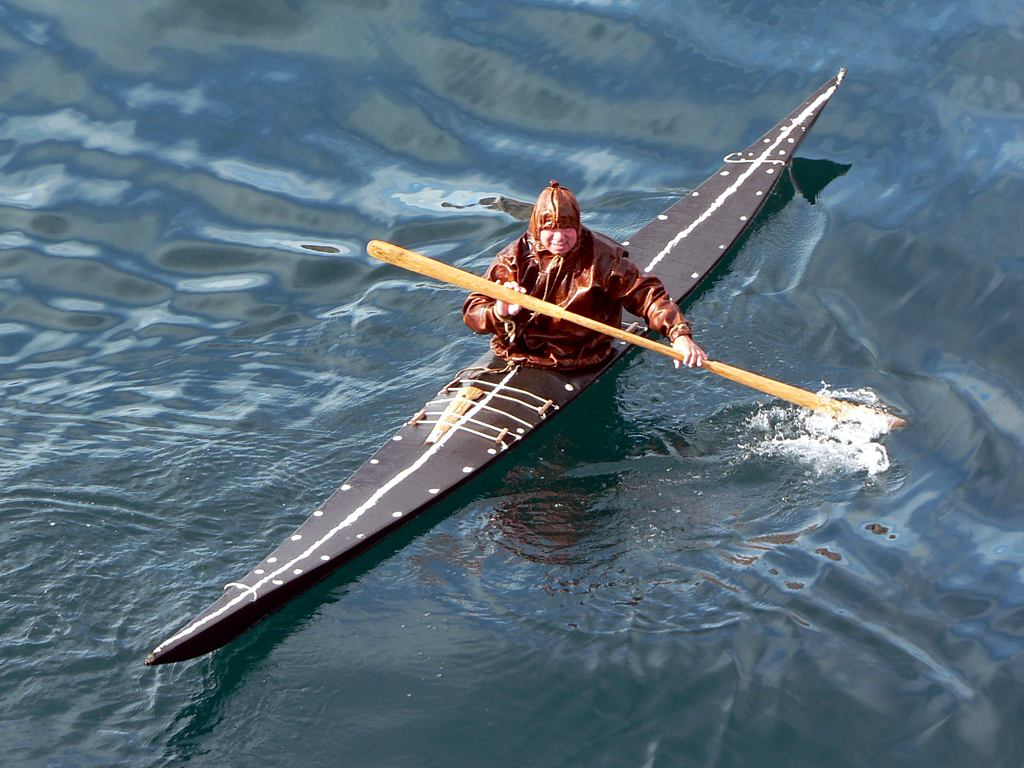
An Inuit kayaker

Kayak angst (Danish: kajaksvimmelhed "kayak dizziness" or kajakangst; Greenlandic: nangiarneq) or nangierneq (Inuit languages) is a condition likened to a panic attack which has historically been associated with the Greenlandic Inuit. It has specifically been described as an episode of intense anxiety amongst seal hunters fishing in kayaks or similar one-man boats. It has additionally been associated with the Igloolik Inuit of Northern Canada, who are said to suffer wild hallucinations of mythical spirits including visions of a 'sea ermine'.

== History ==
Kayak angst, also known as nangierneq in the Greenlandic language, has been described since the 1960s and was initially noted as an issue faced by hunters out alone on a calm sea or lake, especially with the sun directly overhead or shining directly into their eyes. Episodes often occur in foggy or overcast conditions as the sky is reflected on the still, mirror-like water surface, making it difficult to distinguish the horizon and determine up from down. In other circumstances, a number of hunters observed in early studies also reported to be equally affected in rough-weather conditions, such as storm or wind.

'Kayak hunter' in the East Greenlandic dialect is synonymous with 'man' and was considered a rigorous but sought after medical and physical test of one's abilities; Kayak angst was said to be experienced by an estimated 10–20% of these seal hunters, although it had no provable cause or cure. Speculation as to why the condition developed have ranged widely, from a possible hereditary defect among the people of Greenland to a form of post-traumatic stress syndrome caused by the constant life-and-death trials involved in solo seal hunting. No satisfactory reasoning from such disparate ideas have been reached within the research community.

== Symptoms ==
A loss of direction, helpless feelings and psychophysiological responsivity are characteristic of kayak angst. A sensation of cold, rising from below, can make the kayaker feel as if the boat is filling with water. The lone hunter may also feel overcome by an intense fear of drowning, although it has been reported that this particular effect may be diminished upon seeing another hunter or by returning to land. Avoidance behaviours (i.e. becoming reluctant to go on future hunting expeditions) are likely to manifest on subsequent hunting expeditions before such behaviour transitions into a total incapability of hunting in the long-term. It has also been hypothesised that sufferers may be predisposed to other conditions, such as mountain dizziness, and their resistance to such related-afflictions becomes somewhat depleted after a bout of kayak angst.

The most successful way for a lone seal hunter to break the effects of kayak angst is reported to be vigorously and strenuously continuing to paddle; this can be initiated by first rocking the boat and then working towards more sizeable thrusts. Those who have survived agree that it is far more beneficial to move than remain stationary if afflicted.

With modern changes to the traditions and cultural expectations in Inuit hunting rituals, it is believed that this particular condition is likely to have become far less common than in previous years. Due to the specificity of its characterisation, kayak angst can be considered to be an example of a culture-bound syndrome. Some argue kayak angst is an example of what would now be termed panic disorder with agoraphobia.

== See also ==
- Cabin fever
- Nervous breakdown
- Piblokto
- Prairie madness
- Seal hunting
