= Great American Desert =

Historical term for the High Plains region of North America

Coordinates: 30°N 107°W

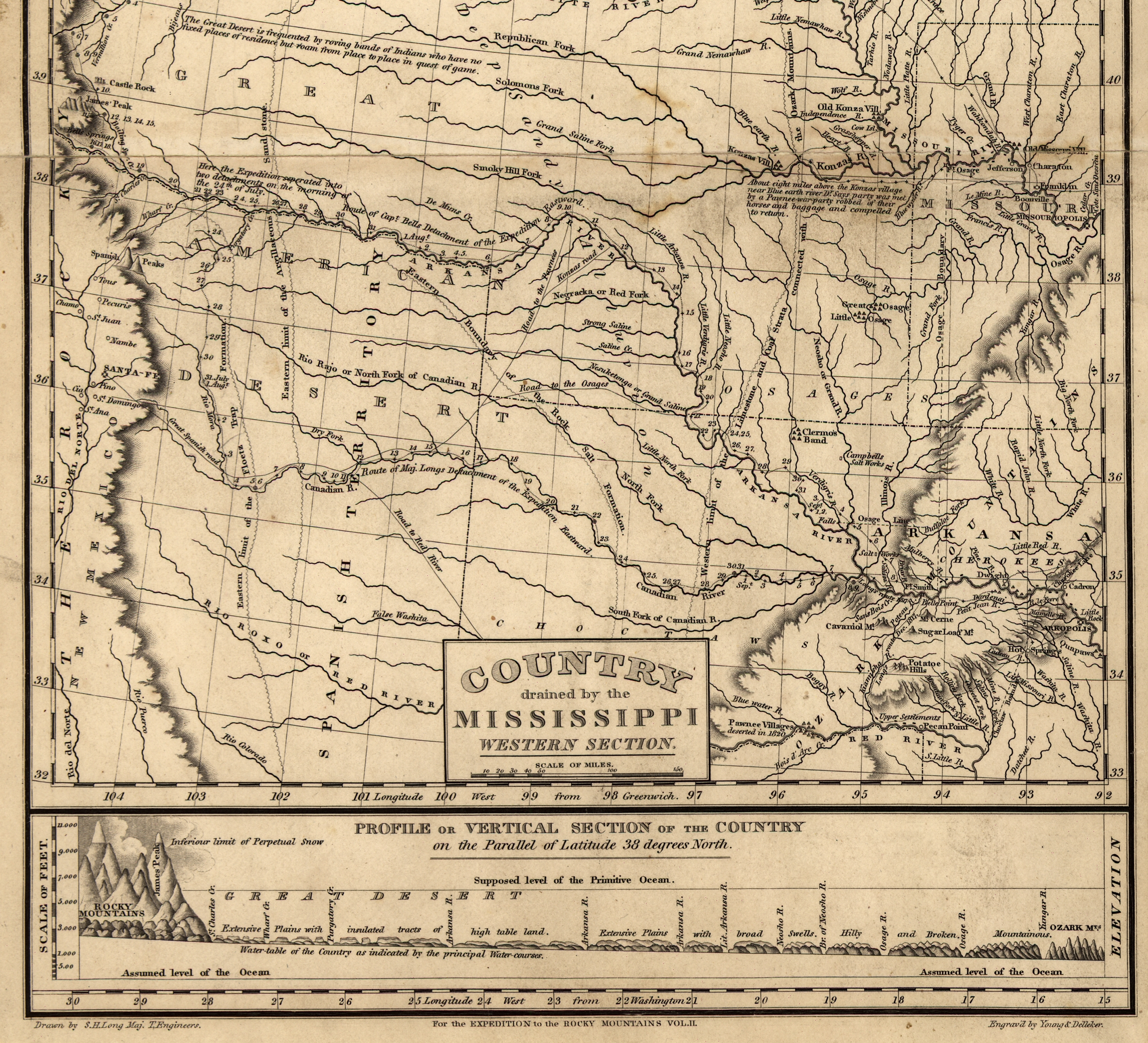
"Great American Desert," mapped by Stephen H. Long in 1820

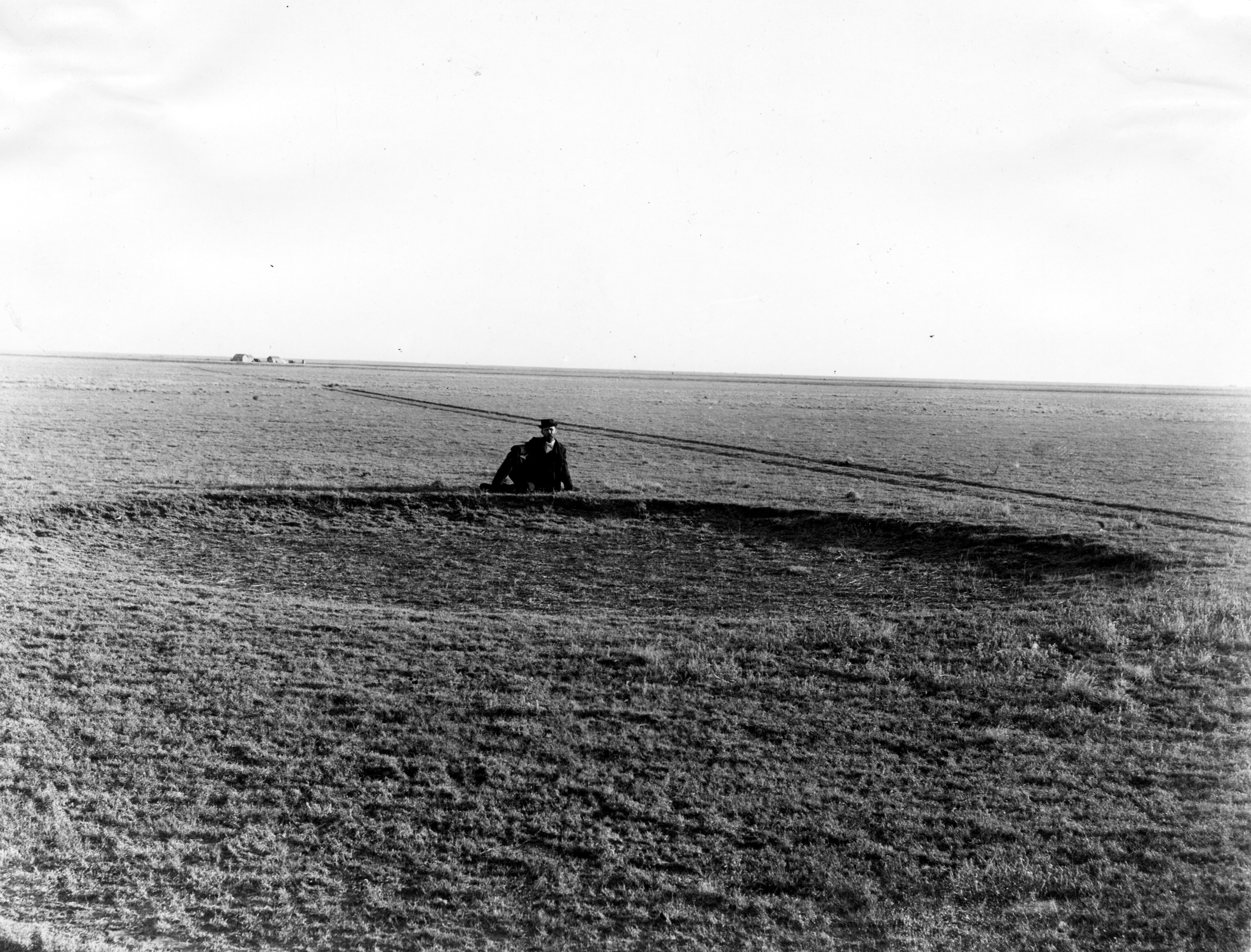
Historic photo of the High Plains in Haskell County, Kansas, showing a treeless semi-arid grassland and a buffalo wallow or circular depression in the level surface. (Photo by W.D. Johnson, 1897)

The term Great American Desert was used in the 19th century to describe the part of North America east of the Rocky Mountains to approximately the 100th meridian. It can be traced to Stephen H. Long's's 1820 scientific expedition which put the Great American Desert on the map.

Today, the area is usually referred to as the High Plains, and the original term is sometimes used to describe the arid region of North America, which includes parts of northwestern Mexico and the American Southwest.

== Concept of "desert" ==
The meaning of the term "desert" has varied through time and across cultures. The term was sometimes used to describe any uninhabited or treeless land, whether or not it was arid. It sometimes refers to hot and arid lands, evoking images of sandy wastelands. Anglo-European colonists believed that treeless lands were not good for agriculture and so the term "desert" also had the connotation of "unfit for farming." However, Spanish colonists had already established successful agricultural communities in the region by this time.

The High Plains region is mostly semi-arid grassland and steppe. Today much of the region supports agriculture through the use of aquifer water irrigation, but in the 19th century, the area's relative lack of water and wood made it seem unfit for settler farming.

== Description ==
When the region was obtained by the United States as part of the Louisiana Purchase in 1803, President Thomas Jefferson wrote of the "immense and trackless deserts" of the region. Zebulon Pike wrote "these vast plains of the western hemisphere, may become in time equally celebrated as the sandy deserts of Africa." His map included a comment in the region, "not a stick of timber." In 1823, Major Stephen Long, a government surveyor and leader of the next official exploration expedition, produced a map labeling the area as the "Great American Desert." In the report that accompanied the map, the party's geographer Edwin James wrote of the region:

I do not hesitate in giving the opinion, that it is almost wholly unfit for cultivation, and of course, uninhabitable by a people depending upon agriculture for their subsistence. Although tracts of fertile land considerably extensive are occasionally to be met with, yet the scarcity of wood and water, almost uniformly prevalent, will prove an insuperable obstacle in the way of settling the country.

Those perceptions were echoed by Washington Irving, who wrote in 1836, "The region, which resembles one of the ancient steppes of Asia, has not inaptly been termed The Great American Desert. It spreads forth into undulating and treeless plains and desolate sandy wastes, wearisome to the eye in their extent and monotony." Descriptions such as Irving's led some geography textbooks of the time to show sand dunes and camels in the area of what is now Kansas and Nebraska.

While many other travelers reported similar conditions and conclusions, there were problems in the interpretation and the use of the word "desert," as descriptions of the American High Plains almost always included comments about "Innumerable Herds of Buffaloes," which was written on Pike's map just above "not a stick of timber." The giant herds and teeming wildlife of the Great Plains were well known by the time the term Great American Desert came into common use and undermine the idea of a wasteland; however, the relevant concept inherent in the reports of the region was that it could not be farmed, which the reports generally agreed on. By the mid-19th century, as settlers migrated across the plains to Oregon and California, the wasteland connotation of "desert" was seen to be false, but the sense of the region as uninhabitable remained until irrigation and railroad transportation made up for the lack of surface water and wood.

== Settlement and development ==
The region's relative lack of water and wood affected the development of the United States. Settlers heading westward often attempted to pass through the region as quickly as possible on their way to what was considered to be better land farther west. The early settlers gave telling names to the various streams of the region, such as "Sweet water Creek" or "Poison Creek." Because it was not considered desirable, the area became one of the last strongholds of independent Native Americans. Railroad interests seeking rights-of-way through the region also benefited from the popular belief that the land was commercially valueless.

By the mid-19th century, people had begun settling in the region despite its poor reputation. The local inhabitants came to realize the area was at the time well suited for farming, partly because large portions of the region sit atop one of the world's largest groundwater reservoirs, the Ogallala Aquifer. Experts of the era proposed theories that maintained the earlier reports had been accurate and the climate had changed. Some even credited the settlers themselves as having caused the change by planting crops and trees. The slogan "rain follows the plow" described that belief, which has since been discredited.

Whether the agricultural productivity of the region in modern times can continue for much longer is in doubt. It has been demonstrated that while there is an abundant amount of fossil water in the Ogallala Aquifer, it is slow to replenish itself, with most of the water in the aquifer having been there since the last ice age. Some current estimates predict the usefulness of the aquifer for agriculture to lessen and become useless, perhaps as soon as the early parts of the mid-21st century, which would lead some farmers to turn away from aquifer-irrigated agriculture.

== In popular culture ==
- A Study in Scarlet (1887) by Arthur Conan Doyle contains a reference to a "desert" in the center of North America:
  In the central portion of the great North American Continent there lies an arid and repulsive desert, which for many a long year served as a barrier against the advance of civilisation. From the Sierra Nevada to Nebraska, and from the Yellowstone River in the north to the Colorado upon the south, is a region of desolation and silence. Nor is Nature always in one mood throughout this grim district. It comprises snow-capped and lofty mountains, and dark and gloomy valleys. There are swift-flowing rivers which dash through jagged cañons; and there are enormous plains, which in winter are white with snow, and in summer are grey with the saline alkali dust. They all preserve, however, the common characteristics of barrenness, inhospitality, and misery.
- In Chapters 20 and 27 of Roughing It (1872), Mark Twain refers to the Great American Desert, but he applies the term to the Forty Mile Desert of Nevada's Lahontan Valley.

== See also ==
- Dust Bowl
- High Plains (United States)
- Llano Estacado
- Prairie madness
- Desert Land Act
- Patagonian Desert
