= Landflucht =

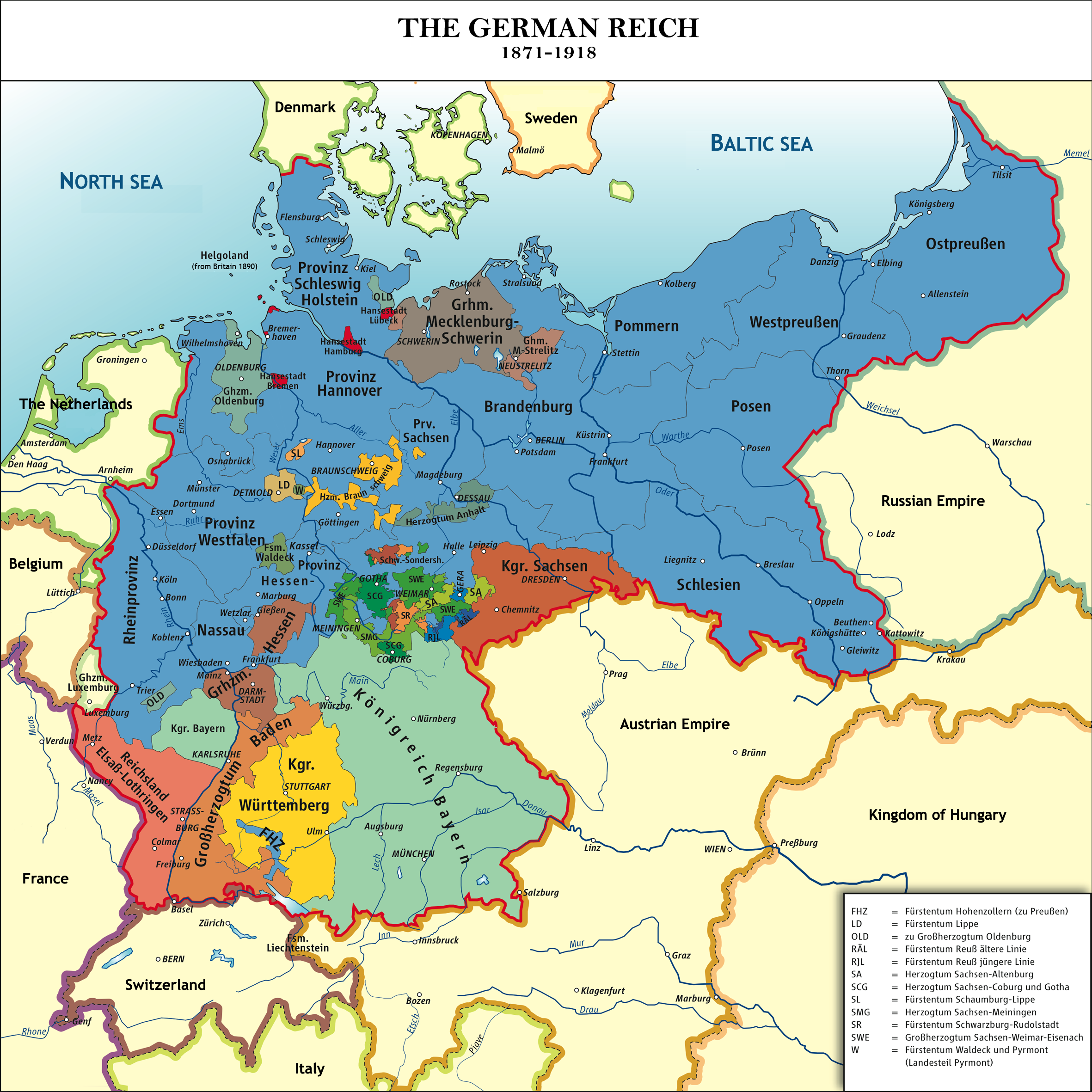
Member states of the German Empire (Prussia shown in blue) during the time of Landflucht

Landflucht (German: [ˈlantˌflʊxt], "flight from the land") refers to the mass migration of peasants into the cities that occurred in Germany (and throughout much of Europe) in the late 19th century.

== Etymology ==
The word landflucht has some negative connotations, as it was coined by agricultural employers (often of the German aristocracy), who were lamenting their labor shortages due to depopulation of rural areas.

== Background ==
In 1800, about 25% of the "German" population lived in cities, and about 75% lived in rural areas. Beginning in the 1850s, ostflucht ("flight from the east"), reflected a growing migration from the less industrialized and urbanized east to the more developed west. The 1870s saw the beginning of the landflucht—when the more industrialized regional cities became increasingly the focus of this migration. At the time, the rural population of Germany still constituted 64% of the population. By 1907, however, it had shrunk to just 33%.

The Prussian provinces of East Prussia, West Prussia, Posen, Silesia, and Pomerania had lost about 1,600,000 people in this rural flight to the cities by 1900. The former agricultural workers and farmers were absorbed into a rapidly growing factory labor class. While in 1800 there had been fewer than 100,000 industrial workers in Germany, their number approached eight million at the turn of the next century. One cause of this mass-migration was the relative decrease in rural income compared to the rates of pay in the cities.

This migration resulted in a major transformation of the German countryside and agriculture system. Mechanized agriculture and migrant workers (particularly Poles from the east—the Sachsengänger) became more common. This was especially true in the province of Posen, which was gained by Prussia when Poland was partitioned. The Polish population of eastern Germany was one of the justifications for the creation of the "Polish corridor" after World War I, and the absorption of the land east of the Oder-Neisse line into Poland after World War II. Also, some labor-intensive enterprises were replaced by much less labor-intensive ones such as game preserves.

== See also ==
- Demographics of Germany

== Bibliography ==
Notes

References

- Drage, Geoffrey (1909). Austria-Hungary. J. Murray. - Total pages: 846
- Kirk, D. (1969). Europe's Population in the Interwar Years. Taylor & Francis. ISBN 0-677-01560-7. - Total pages: 309
- McLean, George F.; Kromkowski, John (1991). Urbanization and Values. Cultural Heritage and Contemporary Change. Vol. 5. Council for Research in Values and Philosophy. ISBN 1-56518-011-9. - Total pages: 380
- von Mises, Ludwig (March 2006). Economic Policy: Thoughts for Today and Tomorrow. Ludwig von Mises Institute. ISBN 1-933550-01-5. - Total pages: 108
- Rankl, Helmut (1999). Landvolk und frühmoderner Staat in Bayern 1400-1800, Part 1 (in German). Kommission für Bayerische Landesgeschichte. ISBN 3-7696-9692-1. - Total pages: 1321
- Schapiro, Jacob Salwyn; Shotwell, James Thomson (1922). Modern and Contemporary European History (1815-1922). Houghton Mifflin Harcourt. - Total pages: 799
- Shafir, Gershon (1996). Land, Labor and the Origins of the Israeli-Palestinian Conflict, 1882–1914. University of California Press. ISBN 0-520-20401-8. - Total pages: 287
