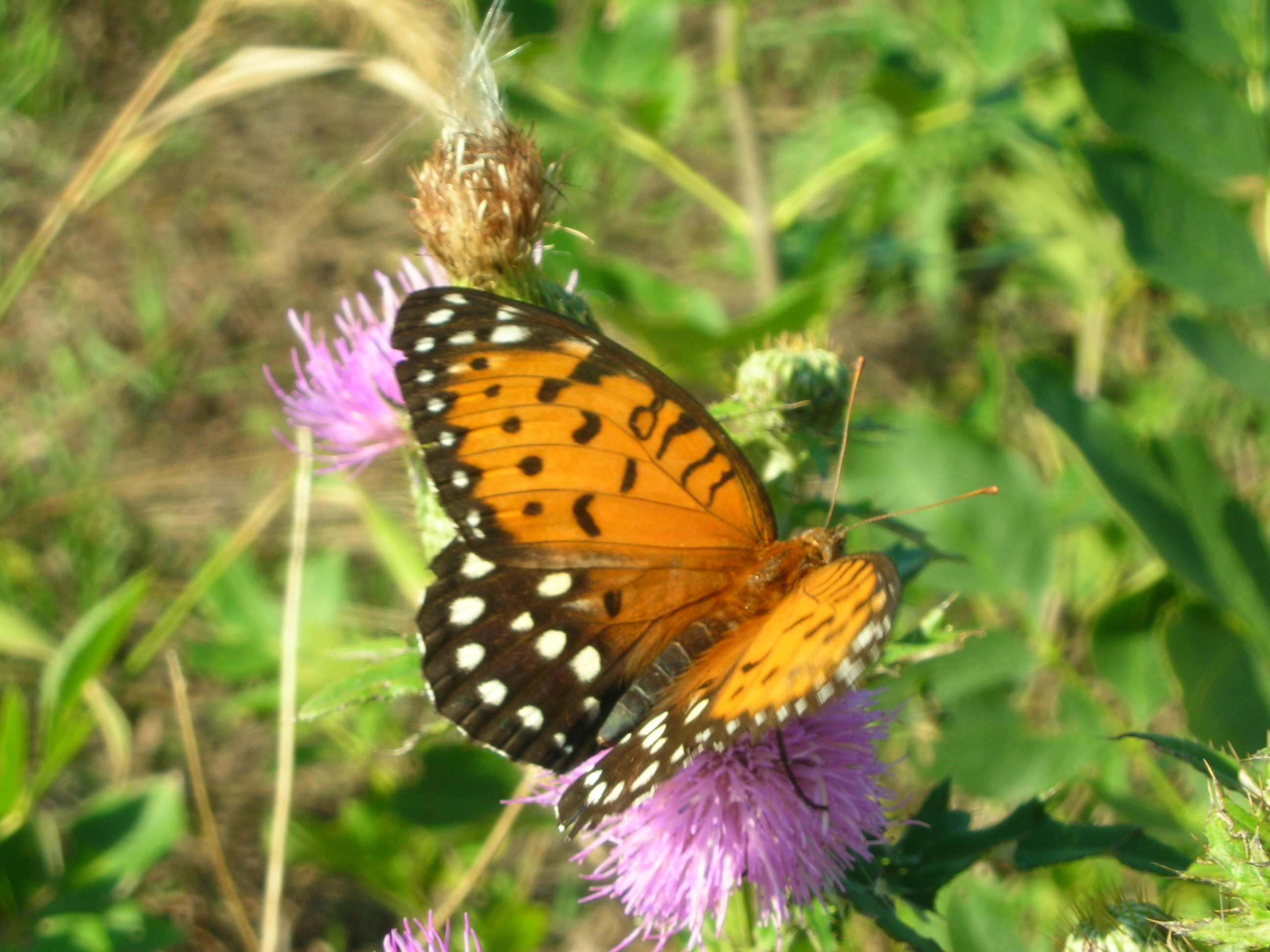

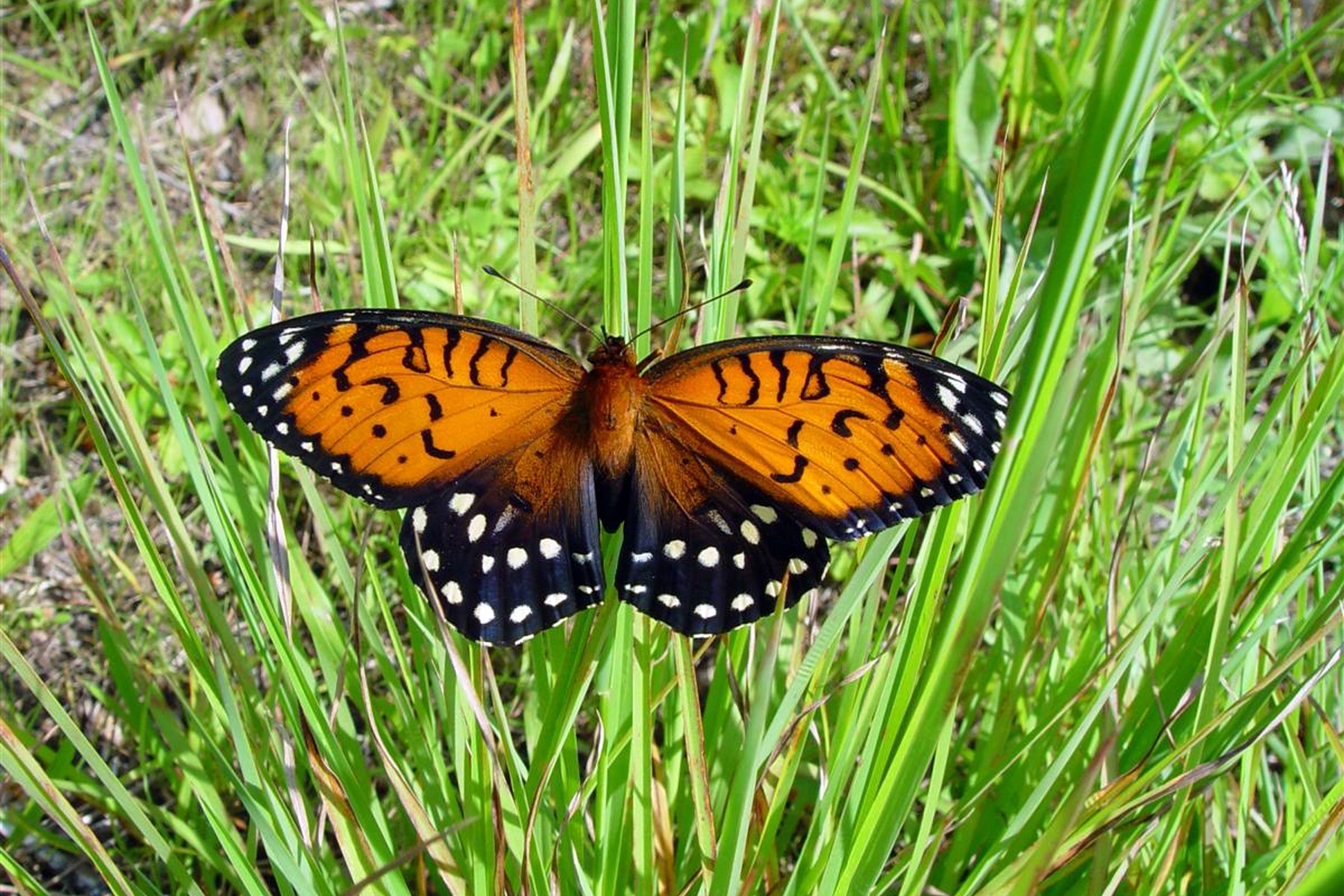

Conservation status
- Vulnerable (IUCN 3.1)

Scientific classification
- Kingdom: Animalia
- Phylum: Arthropoda
- Clade: Pancrustacea
- Class: Insecta
- Order: Lepidoptera
- Family: Nymphalidae
- Genus: Speyeria
- Species: S. idalia

Binomial name
- Speyeria idalia (Drury, 1773)
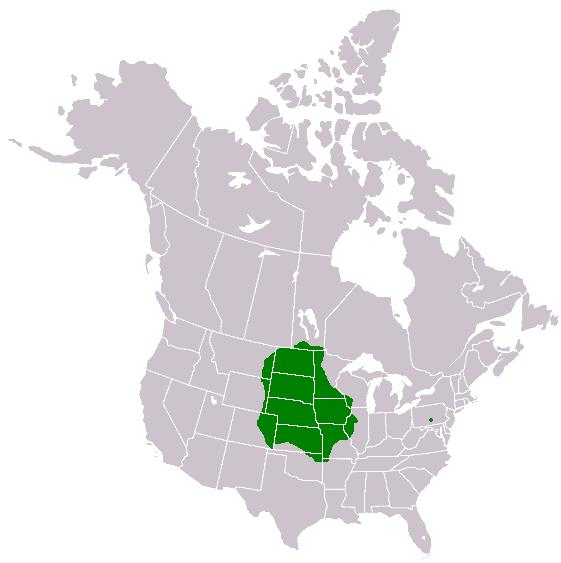

= Regal fritillary =

Species of butterfly

The regal fritillary (Speyeria idalia) is a striking nymphalid butterfly found in tallgrass and mixed-grass prairies in the east-central United States. This prairie-specialist butterfly is deep orange with distinctive dark hindwings with two bands of spots (Brock 2003). On the female, both bands of spots are white; on the male, the outer band of spots is orange. Females also tend to be slightly larger than males. The ventral surface of the hindwings is olive brown to black in color with bold silvery white spots (Selby 2007). The wingspan of S. idalia usually measures 68–105 millimetres (2.7–4.1 in) (Selby 2007). Flight is in the summertime from approximately June to September and adults tend to be swift in flight, coasting close to the ground (Brock 2003). It is listed as a species of special concern and believed extirpated in the US state of Connecticut.

Regal fritillary larvae are approximately 0.08 inches long after they hatch and reach a length of approximately 1.75 inches when fully developed (Edwards 1879). The mature larvae have a black body with yellowish-orange bands and stripes. There are yellowish middorsal and lateral stripes and a number of dorsal, subdorsal, and lateral fleshy spines extending from the body. The head of the mature larva is rounded and small, orangish-red on top and black underneath (Edwards 1879).

The larval food source for the regal fritillary and all members of the genus Speyeria are violets (Viola spp.) (Selby 2007). The violets are an extremely important component of habitat sustainability for the regal fritillary and there is a correlation between the number of violets present and the number of butterflies found in a given area (Kelly and Debinski 1998). Violet species that the larvae feed on include Viola pedata (bird's-foot violet), V. pedatifida (blue prairie violet), V. papilionacea (common blue violet), V. lanceolata (lance-leafed violet), V. nuttallii (Nuttall's violet) (Kelly and Debinski 1998), V. sagittata (arrowleaf violet), and V. tricolor (Johnny Jumpup) (Selby 2007). These various violet species are associated with the different areas of the regal fritillary's range. For example, the bird's-foot violet and the prairie violet tend to be the preferred larval food source for the regal in the Midwest and Great Plains regions (Selby 2007).

The adult butterflies may feed on a variety of nectar plants and their availability throughout the summer flight time can be as important as the presence of larval food plants in determining whether an area can support populations of butterfly species (Selby 2007). Milkweeds, thistles, coneflowers, blazing-stars, bergamots, clovers, goldenrods, and ironweeds are some of the most important nectar sources for adult regal fritillaries. Milkweeds and thistles have been observed to be the preferred nectar source throughout the regal fritillary's range (Selby 2007). These two types of plants provide a constant supply of nectar due to their staggered growth times. Common milkweed starts blooming when male regal fritillaries begin to emerge early in the summer and thistles tend to bloom later in the season which is crucial to females approaching oviposition (Selby 2007).

== Reproduction and life cycle ==
The regal fritillary is univoltine, having a single generation per year (Selby 2007). Adult male butterflies emerge in early June along with the first milkweed plants. Adult females emerge shortly after and mating takes place in late June and early July. After mating, females enter a 6 to 8 week period of reproductive diapause, or a suspended period of development. The ovaries remain undeveloped during this time. Oogenesis does not initiate until late August when juvenile hormone sharply increases (Kopper et al. 2001). Once oogenesis takes place, the eggs are fertilized and soon after, oviposition occurs. The female lays over 1,000 eggs and possibly more than 2,000 (Vaughan and Shepherd, 2005). The small larvae hatch in late September and into October. Immediately after hatching, the tiny larvae seek protective covering in the leaf litter and overwinter there. At this stage the larvae delay development over the winter months and this is known as larval diapause (Kopper et al. 2001). Once spring arrives, the larvae emerge and begin feeding on violets. They grow and mature through six instar stages until late May when they pupate (Selby 2007).

The life cycle of the regal fritillary is unique and is thought to be an adaptation to the phenology, or seasonal timing and nature, of their larval food plant, the violet (Kopper et al. 2001). These small perennial violets produce abundant foliage in the spring for the growing larvae. However, in most areas they senesce in the heat of the summer and become unavailable to the larvae at that time. When this occurs, the regal fritillary is entering into its adult life and is no longer dependent on the violet. The fact that the violets remain unable to support larvae throughout the rest of the summer helps to explain the regal fritillary's univoltine life cycle. The larval diapause coupled with the adult female reproductive diapause enables the larvae to maximize the benefits of fresh and abundant violet foliage when they are active in the spring (Kopper et al. 2001).

== Declining populations ==
With a loss of more than 99% of the original native tallgrass prairie landcover today (Powell et al. 2006), the regal fritillary is threatened by habitat loss. Drastic declines in regal fritillary populations have led to much concern about the butterfly's future (Kopper et al. 2001). Historically, the regal fritillary's range extended from eastern Colorado to Maine. However, due to habitat loss and large-scale population declines, their range has been far reduced, especially in the east.

From the 1960s through the early 1990s, eastern populations had declined so severely that only a few remain. (Powell et al. 2006) The regal fritillary was once present in 18 states east of Illinois. Today, only three populations remain in the eastern region. These populations have been located east of Indiana: Fort Indiantown Gap Pennsylvania, Radford Army Ammunition Plant in Virginia. Populations in the Midwest and Great Plains are much more widespread; however, they remain extremely vulnerable as their numbers continue to decline. The regal fritillary is not federally listed as an endangered species, but it has been assigned a NatureServe conservation status of G3, which is considered vulnerable (Selby 2007). S. idalia was a Category II species, or a possible candidate for listing under the Endangered Species Act, until 1996 when this category was eliminated by the federal government (Kelly and Debinski 1998). WildEarth Guardians submitted a new petition to list the species in 2013 (WildEarth Guardians 2013). The findings of formal review have not been published as of 1 May 2014.

== Threats ==
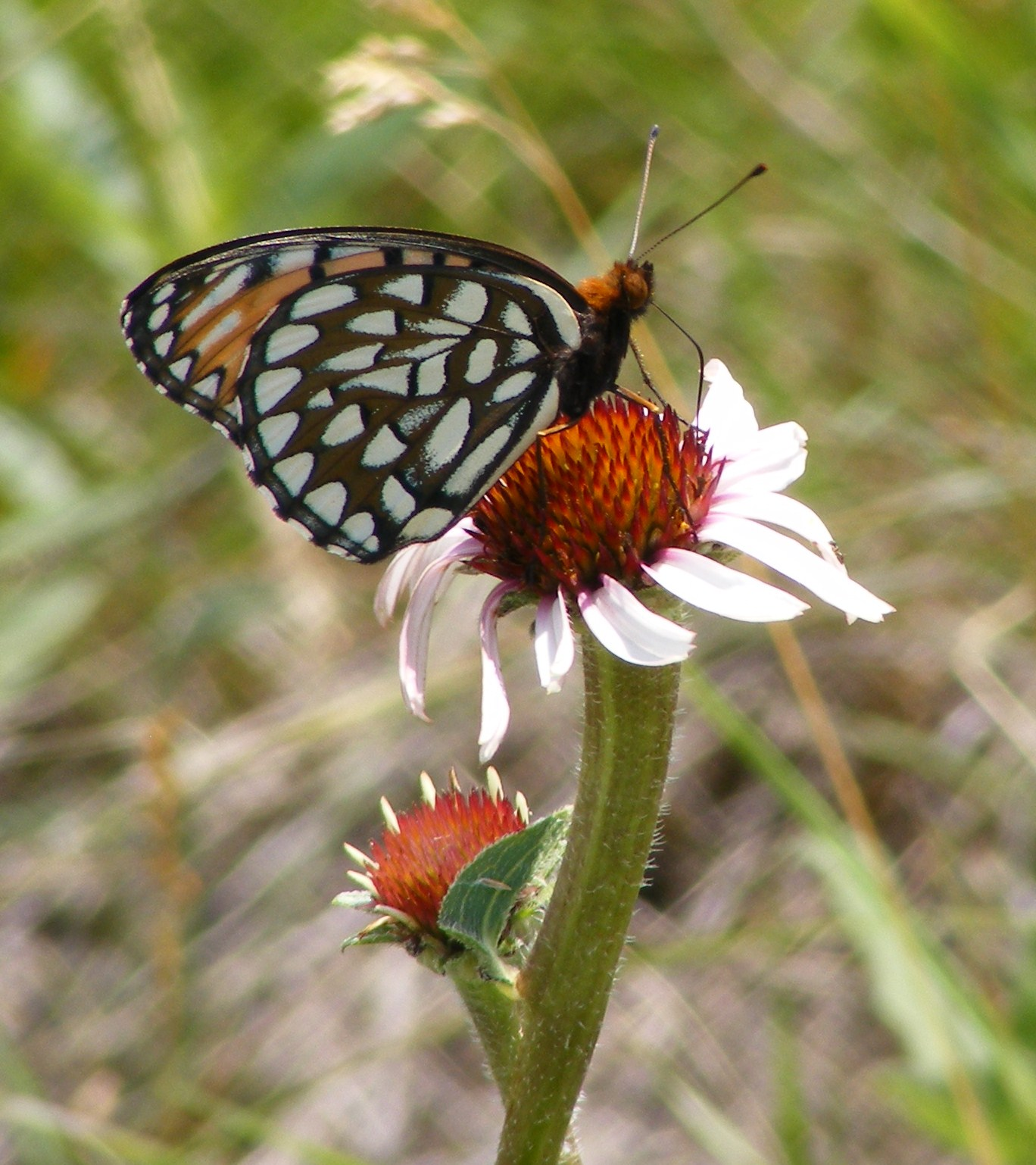
A regal fritillary gets a meal from a purple coneflower (Echinacea angustifolia) at Lake Emma WPA in Waubay Wetland Management District.

The greatest threat the regal fritillary faces is habitat destruction (Powell et al. 2006). A number of factors continue to contribute to the loss, fragmentation, and degradation of the butterfly's habitat. Row crop agriculture, urban developments such as housing and business construction, road construction, and gravel mining all contribute to the disappearance and degradation of the prairies that regal fritillaries depend on. Since regal fritillaries require relatively non-degraded native tallgrass and mixed-grass prairies, the alteration of these landscapes has pushed them into a highly vulnerable status (Selby 2007).

Largely due to the loss and degradation of the tallgrass prairie landscape, violet plant density tends to be limited or greatly reduced in certain areas. This has been shown to have a negative impact on regal fritillary populations. A study conducted by Kelly and Debinski (1998) looked at larval food source limitations as a factor in the declining regal fritillary populations. The authors correlated violet plant density to population size and weights of regal fritillary butterflies. It was found that prairies with significantly lower violet densities had smaller populations of S. idalia. Butterfly weights were also slightly lower in areas with low violet density (Kelly and Debinski 1998). As a result, a number of concerns have been raised regarding the health of the regal fritillary. Areas with few or no violets can be detrimental to female fecundity because there are few suitable places for the eggs to be laid (Kelly and Debinski 1998). Also, smaller fragmented populations are susceptible to restricted gene flow and reduced genetic variability (Williams et al. 2003). This study also showed that habitat quality for the regal fritillary is just as important as the amount of habitat available. Increased violet density and nectar availability are essential to maintaining healthy populations (Kelly and Debinski 1998).

Habitat fragmentation and isolation can have large-scale genetic effects on high gene flow species such as the regal fritillary. There is an increased likelihood of population extirpation among high gene flow species experiencing habitat fragmentation (Williams et al. 2003). Williams et al. (2003) compared levels of genetic differentiation and diversity among populations with a relatively continuous habitat to populations in isolated habitat areas. It was found that the isolated and highly fragmented populations had increased differentiation, or divergence from other populations, and decreased genetic diversity in comparison to non-fragmented populations. Restricted gene flow and population bottlenecks likely occur among populations in fragmented habitat areas, causing these phenomena (Williams et al. 2003). As habitat fragmentation continues to increase in much of the regal fritillary's Midwestern range, genetic problems may become a real threat, disrupting gene flow and increasing the risk of disease.

Prescribed burning is an attractive and widely used conservation tool among land managers today. The historic role that fire played in the prairie landscape can be highly beneficial to many plant species. Prescribed burns have also become a popular low-cost alternative for removing woody vegetation on rural and agricultural lands (Powell et al. 2006). However, there has been some evidence that intensive fire management used on prairie lands can negatively affect the regal fritillary. Powell et al. (2006) examined the effects of prescribed prairie burns by surveying a number of prairies in Kansas. Butterflies were observed on both recently burned and unburned sites to determine the effects of prescribed burning on the populations. Population density of the regal fritillary may tend to vary among sites but was generally considerably higher at sites that had not been burned in the past year (Powell et al. 2006). Prescribed burns are usually conducted in the early spring when the first instar larvae are vulnerable, buried in the leaf litter. Extensive prairie burns kill the overwintering larvae and can have a drastic effect on their population in the following years. One recently burned prairie that was studied used minimal patch burning, burning only small portions of the entire area at a time. This site had by far the highest regal fritillary abundance of any burned site (Powell et al. 2006).

A serious potential threat to the regal fritillary was discovered in a captive breeding study. Wagner (1995) found that disease is a possible mortality factor in some S. idalia populations. In a captive group, nuclear polyhedrosis virus (NPV) caused an 80% loss. The virus is transmitted from females to offspring in eggs or between individuals through excreta (Wagner 1995). NPV could potentially be damaging to populations in the wild (Mason 2007); thus, for reintroduction purposes, culturing a virus-free line is critical.

The regal fritillary is highly vulnerable to environmental factors year-round. Extreme weather conditions over a large geographical range can severely influence their populations. First instar larvae are highly sensitive to extreme weather conditions as they overwinter in the leaf litter and as they begin their search for food plants in the spring. Hard frosts late in the spring, severe storms, and cool damp conditions have all been shown to negatively impact larvae survival (Selby 2007). Larval development rates tend to be proportional to the temperature. Therefore, unusually cool conditions in the spring can drastically slow larval growth rates, increasing their exposure to mortality factors (Selby 2007). Some environmental factors can limit adult regal fritillary activity as well. Prolonged periods of cooler temperatures, cloudy skies, and rain can restrict normal activities, perhaps limiting reproduction (Selby 2007).

The increased use of pesticides and herbicides can have profound negative effects on the regal fritillary as well. Heavy spraying of herbicides can eliminate nearby larval food plants and nectar sources that they depend on (Selby 2007). The indiscriminate use of pesticides also poses a threat to regal fritillaries and other prairie-specialist butterflies. The bacterial pathogen Bacillus thuringiensis ("Bt", the agent used in gypsy moth control) is lethal to all Lepidoptera larvae. It is thought that the gypsy moth control programs used in the east along wooded grassland edges may have been a final factor leading to the loss of some populations (Selby 2007). Broadcast spraying of insecticides for pest control on adjacent crop land and rangeland continues to be a direct threat to the regal fritillary.

== Conservation ==
Future losses among regal fritillary populations can be prevented by identifying critical habitat areas and managing them to maintain and improve habitat size, quality, and connectivity (Selby 2007). It is essential that land be set aside and protected in this manner. Land management practices should focus on the maintenance of intact native prairie remnants and the vegetation that is crucial to the regal fritillary's continued survival. Managing for abundant larval food plants and nectar resources is extremely important. The timing, intensity, level, and duration of management activities must be adapted and monitored (Selby 2007). It has been suggested that proper management practices could play a crucial role in slowing, and possibly even reversing, the current wave of regal fritillary extirpations (Swengel 2004).

The Midwest landscape includes few prairie remnants which are embedded in an agricultural matrix (Davis et al. 2007). Thus, it is extremely important that the land surrounding prairie remnants be included in management decisions and practices. The quality of the matrix surrounding a particular habitat fragment often makes a difference on a species' dispersal ability (Davis et al. 2007). Edge effects must be considered and managed to improve the butterfly's dispersal capabilities. Connectivity between regal fritillary habitats is extremely important to consider in land management practices and would likely increase gene flow and genetic diversity in certain areas. This would help to reduce some of the negative effects associated with habitat fragmentation, increasing the overall health of regal fritillary populations.

Though it was found that extensive fire management can have direct negative impacts on regal fritillary populations, prescribed burns can be beneficial to many plant species, including violets and nectar plants (Selby 2007). This could in turn provide some increased habitat benefits for the butterfly if prescribed burns are used appropriately. Fire management also helps to remove cool season exotics and woody vegetation that encroach on native prairie plants such as the violet. Thus it is important to understand both the positive and negative effects of fire management and its combined effects on the long-term survival of the regal fritillary (Selby 2007). It is recommended that only small portions, no more than 20% of the total butterfly habitat, be burned in a given year. It has also been suggested that 3 to 5 year burn rotations be used where a certain plot of land must remain unburned for at least 3 to 5 years before it can be burned again. These practices would likely minimize the negative effects of fire management on regal fritillary populations, while likely providing them with some increased benefits due to higher quality food and nectar resources. It has also been suggested that very light grazing is also beneficial to these prairie specialist butterflies and can effectively be used in combination with limited prescribed burning (Selby 2007).

A limited use of herbicides and pesticides is fine; however, it should be closely monitored and carefully applied where the regal fritillary is concerned (Selby 2007). Increasing awareness among surrounding agricultural areas regarding the use of herbicides and pesticides is critical. Decreasing the use of herbicides and pesticides on agricultural lands directly adjacent to prairie habitats may be beneficial to regal fritillary populations as well as to many other native prairie insects. It is best to avoid or limit the widespread and indiscriminate use of these control agents in such areas (Selby 2007). Prairies that manage for invasive plants and woody vegetation by applying herbicides should do so with extreme caution and moderation. The use of selective applications such as spot spraying is better as well as using non-persistent herbicides. Reseeding may also be necessary after some herbicide applications so that beneficial native species remain plentiful. However, the use of herbicide on prairie lands should be a last resort to removing unwanted vegetation in order to protect regal fritillary populations (Selby 2007).

Since there is limited knowledge about the exact distribution and abundance of many regal fritillary populations, it is crucial that inventory and monitoring practices are carried out. A better understanding of the regal fritillary could further conservation efforts. Accurately surveying populations is crucial to monitoring practices and provides a great deal of useful information about specific populations. Pollard transect surveys obtain results of relative abundance values which can be used to track trends in abundance over time (Selby 2007). This method is better for long-term monitoring of populations and can be useful in tracking the status of the regal fritillary over time.
