= Manitoba Tall Grass Prairie Preserve =

Conservation area in Manitoba, Canada

Tall Grass Prairie Preserve
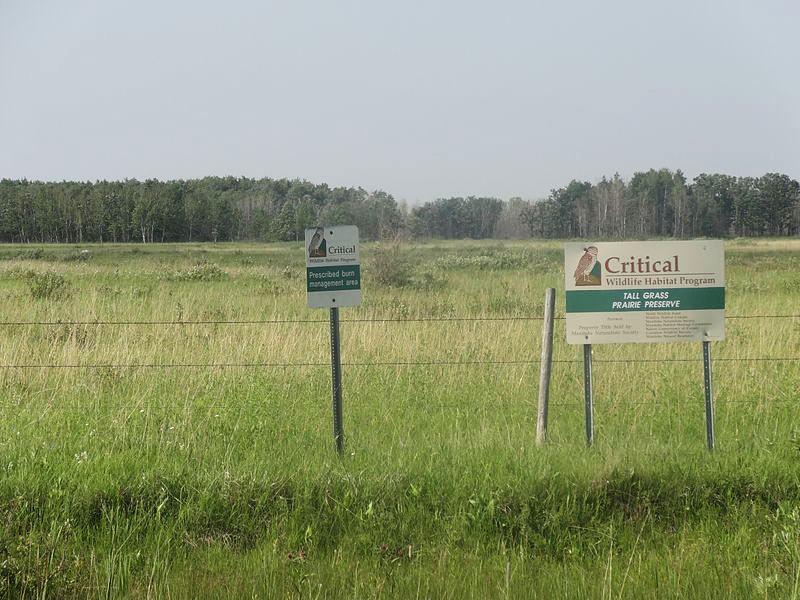
- Signs identifying a section of the Tall Grass Prairie Preserve as critical habitat.

- Location within Manitoba
- Type: Nature preserve
- Location: Rural Municipality of Stuartburn
- Nearest city: Steinbach, Manitoba
- Coordinates: 49°04′45″N 96°43′53″W
- Area: 5,800 hectares (58 km^{2})
- Created: 1980s
- Operator: Nature Conservancy of Canada; Government of Manitoba; Environment and Climate Change Canada; Manitoba Habitat Heritage Corporation; Nature Manitoba

The Manitoba Tall Grass Prairie Preserve is located in southeastern Manitoba near Gardenton and Vita, this is about 50 kilometres (31 mi) south of Steinbach, Manitoba. It is one of the last remaining stands of tallgrass prairie in Manitoba and is part of the Tallgrass Aspen Parkland conservation area in Manitoba and Minnesota. Several groups and organizations help in land preservation in the Manitoba Tall Grass Prairie such as the Nature Conservancy of Canada, Nature Manitoba, Environment Canada, Manitoba Conservation and the Manitoba Habitat Heritage Corporation.

== Manitoba tallgrass prairie ==
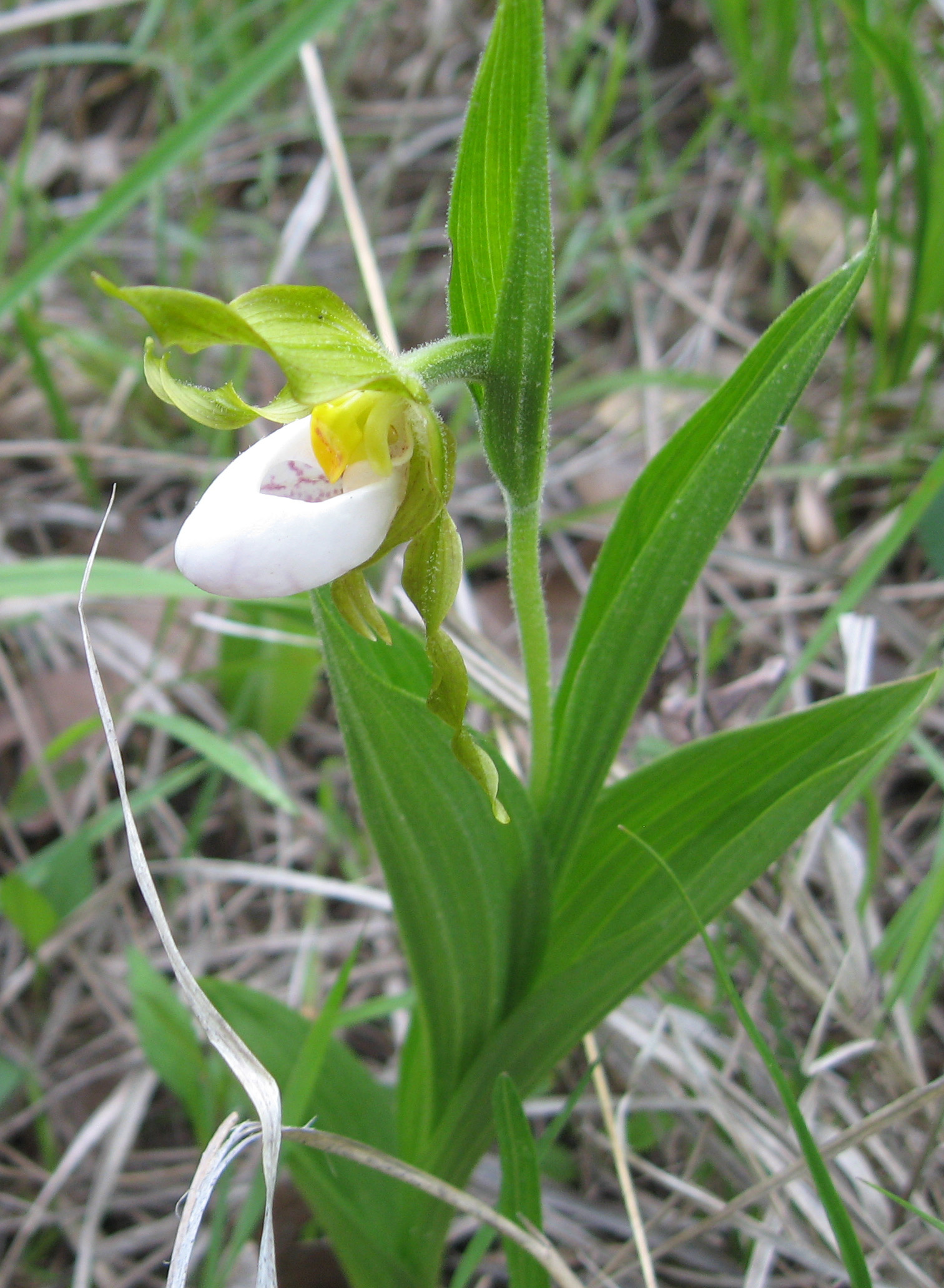
A small white-lady's slipper. These endangered orchids are found in the preserve.

Only about 0.5% of the original 6,000 kilometres (3,700 mi) tallgrass prairie in Manitoba remains. The area is characterized by a mosaic of habitat types, including tallgrass prairie, aspen woodland, sedge meadow wetlands, riparian woodland, and oak savannah. Over 1,000 species depend on this diverse habitat and 16 species that are on provincial or national endangered species list reside within the area.

The ecological significance of the area that is now the preserve was only discovered in the late 1980s by botanists of the Manitoba Naturalist Society who were cataloging native plant species in the area. They discovered that a significant portion of the tallgrass prairie remained despite the belief it had been wiped out. As of 2025, there are over 5,800 hectares (58 km^{2}) that are protected in the preserve.

The 13-part television series Canada: A People's History was filmed on location in the preserve for the realistic settings of First Nations encampments and Metis ox carts.

== Flora and fauna ==
The endangered western prairie fringed orchid in the preserve.

The Manitoba Preserve is home to over 1,000 species during the course of the year, as well as a number of endangered or threatened species of plants and animals.

=== Plants ===
The Tall Grass Prairie Preserve consists primarily of big bluestem (or turkey foot, resembles the bird's foot), little bluestem, porcupine needlegrass (Stipa spartea), and prairie dropseed grasses. The last known Canadian remnant population of the endangered western prairie fringed orchid (Platanthera praeclara) is within the preserve. It is the world's largest Platanthera praeclara population, containing over half the known population of the orchid.

Other federally and provincially listed endangered species are the small white lady's slipper (Cypripedium candidum), of which 34,491 stems were counted in the Preserve in 1998, and 16,899 of them were flowering stems. Others include the Great Plains ladies tresses, Culver's root, and Riddell's goldenrod. Some other prominent plants include sundrops, two-flowered cynthia, whorled loosestrife, whorled milkwort, and wild geranium which can all be found within the preserve, though they are not listed on provincial or federal species at risk lists.

=== Animals ===
The endangered Powesheik skipper can be found in the preserve. The Dakota skipper was previously found in the area with specimens being retrieved in the 1980s and last claimed to be found in 2000. Since then they are believed to have been extirpated, their loss believed in part possible from a wildfire and burns designed to control woody encroachment in 2001 and 2002. This prairie-endemic species is also threatened by woody encroachment into prairies. The possibility of reintroducing the skipper to the preserve was studied in 2006 but considered unfeasible at the time due to the low density of larval and adult host plants.

Also found are nesting pairs of sandhill cranes, garter snakes, the plains pocket gopher, and prairie vole.

== Trails ==
There are a number of partnerships in the Tall Grass Prairie Preserve one of which being The Nature Conservancy of Canada which owns some land in the Vita area. The NCC also maintains and operates a 1.6 km trail which is available to the public called the Aggasiz Trail as well as the Prairie Orchid Trail adjacent to the Weston Family Tall Grass Prairie Interpretive Centre in Stuartburn.

There is also another 1.5-kilometre (0.93 mi) trail in the Tall Grass Prairie Preserve that has been laid out in the southern portion of the preserve. This trail is owned by the Manitoba Habitat Heritage Corporation, a provincial Crown Corporation which owns some land in the Vita area. There is a "Prairie Day" in the community of Gardenton that is held on the second Saturday of every August. During this time they showcase the flora and fauna of the land and help to educate children and others on the preserve. During this time some species like the smooth green snake are showcased.

== Management ==
Great plains ladies tresses growing in September in the preserve.

Much of the original tallgrass prairie disappeared due to the fact that it was prime agricultural land. Indeed, the reason why most of the Manitoba Tall Grass Prairie Preserve remains is because much of the land is unfarmable by machine because of the many boulders left behind by glaciers.

Tallgrass however is a complicated ecosystem that has relied on various measures over time to control it and encourage growth of different species. Historically vast herds of the now extirpated plains bison would help through grazing to eliminate grasses and more importantly the growth of shrubs and trees to prevent the prairie from turning into forest. Fires would sweep through the areas helping to again eliminate trees and shrubs but allowing the native prairie species to survive because of their deep root systems that have adapted and evolved to survive grass fires.

Management and conservation groups have taken these past lessons into consideration and are trialing various methods in the preserve which include grazing and controlled burns. They are trying to determine which method or group of methods is best to control invasive species and which encourage growth of the native species as each species of flora in the preserve grows and flourishes in one specific area or another. When these tactics are used together it helps to maintain a diverse and balanced prairie ecosystem.

== Agricultural use ==
Native prairie is thought to have had a historical dependence on regular disturbances such as grazing, browsing and fire in order to prevent widespread encroachment of trees and shrubs into grasslands and sedge meadows. As such, land managers work with local agricultural producers to ensure regular disturbance of thousands of acres annually via modern agricultural practices such as cattle grazing and haying.

=== Research ===
Dozens of research projects have occurred at the Manitoba Tall Grass Prairie Preserve. A one-day research symposium focused on the Preserve was hosted by the Nature Conservancy of Canada at the Weston Family Tall Grass Prairie Interpretive Centre in October 2013.
