= Tallgrass Aspen Parkland =

Ecoregion spanning parts of Manitoba and Minnesota

Coordinates: 48.9°N 95.9°W

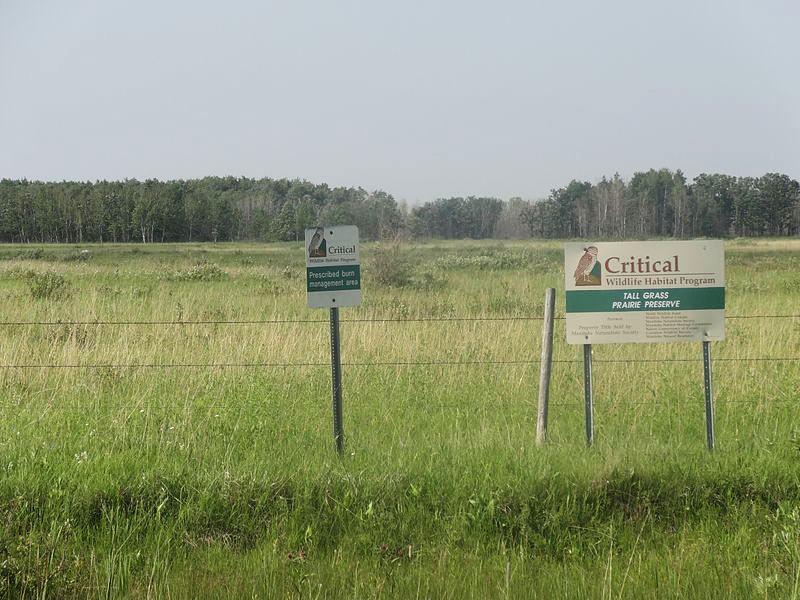
- The Manitoba Tall Grass Prairie Preserve, part of the network in Manitoba, Canada

Geography
- Countries: Canada, United States

The Tallgrass Aspen Parkland is an ecoregion located in southeastern Manitoba and northwestern Minnesota. The area is characterized by a mosaic of habitat types, including tallgrass prairie, aspen woodland, sedge meadow wetlands, riparian woodland, and oak savanna. A number of endangered and threatened species occur in the area, including the western prairie fringed orchid and Dakota skipper. One of Minnesota's only wild elk herds utilizes the area as well.

A number of conservation organizations, as well as provincial and state governments are involved in conservation activities in the Tallgrass Aspen Parkland. Major conservation partners include The Nature Conservancy, the Nature Conservancy of Canada, the Manitoba Conservation Data Centre, the Minnesota Department of Natural Resources, the Manitoba Tall Grass Prairie Preserve, and Manitoba Conservation. These partners collaborated to produce a Conservation Area Plan for the area in 2006.
