= Glacial Ridge National Wildlife Refuge =

National wildlife refuge in Minnesota, United States

- IUCN category IV (habitat/species management area)
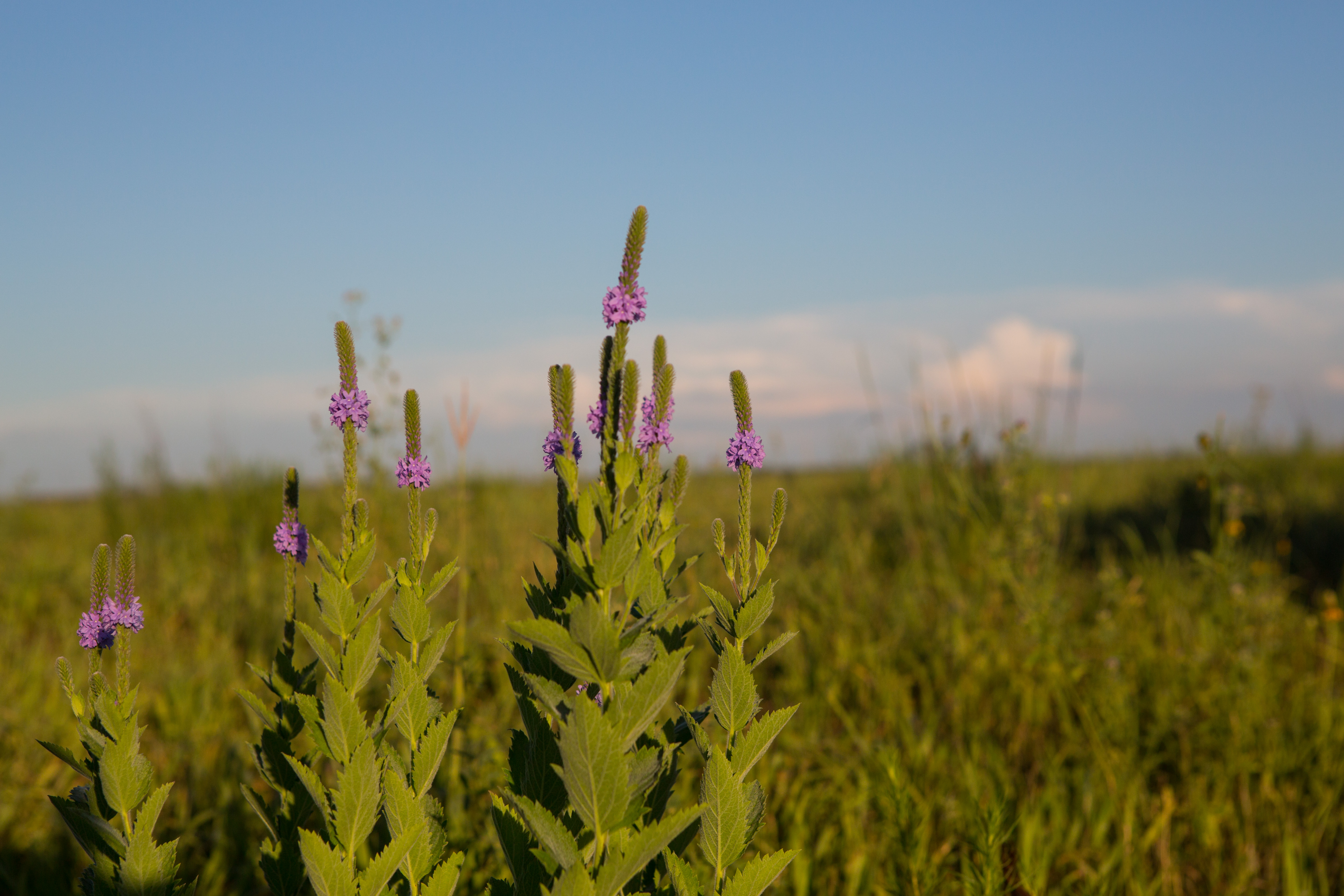

- Location within the United States
- Location: Polk County, Minnesota, United States
- Nearest city: Mentor, Minnesota
- Coordinates: 47°42′00″N 96°21′00″W
- Area: 37,756 acres (152.79 km^{2}) (Planned)
- Established: October 12, 2004
- Governing body: U.S. Fish and Wildlife Service
- Website: Glacial Ridge National Wildlife Refuge

Glacial Ridge National Wildlife Refuge was created on October 12, 2004, the 545th National Wildlife Refuge in the United States. Its creation was the result of cooperation between at least 30 agencies or governmental entities. The creation of the refuge was spearheaded by The Nature Conservancy, and the initial endowment of 2,300 acres (9.3 km^{2}) of land was donated by the Conservancy. In light of its planned final size of 37,756 acres (153 km^{2}), it is described by the US Fish and Wildlife Service as "the largest tallgrass prairie and wetland restoration project in U.S. history".

Prior to being acquired by The Nature Conservancy in 2000, the majority of Glacial Ridge National Wildlife Refuge was used for marginal farming. More than 20,000 acres that comprise the central region of Glacial Ridge National Wildlife Refuge were restored by the Conservancy with the aid of land stewards, collaborators, volunteers, and money from USDA's Natural Resources Conservation Service. This was the biggest prairie-wetland restoration project in American history at the time.

Restorations of wetlands and prairies have reduced overland runoff and ditch flow during storms, improved water quality, and significantly altered the hydrologic cycle's flow rates. Between 2002 and 2015, there was a 14% decline in cropland, a 6% rise in wetlands, and a 19% increase in natural prairie as a result of wetland and prairie restorations.

== Location ==
The Glacial Ridge NWR is located six miles (9.7 km) west of Mentor, Minnesota, or about twelve miles (19 km) east of Crookston, Minnesota.

== Description ==
From its original area of 2,300 acres (9 km^{2}), the refuge is slated to grow to at least 37,756 acres (153 km^{2}). Of this planned area 5,000 acres (20 km^{2}) previously existed in an unplowed state, and a further 8,000 acres (32 km^{2}) has been seeded with native prairie grasses. In addition, more than 100 wetlands have been restored. The restoration of native tallgrass prairie is ongoing, and will require years of effort.

== Purpose ==
The following five items are the main objectives of the refuge:

- Strive to maintain diversity and increase abundance of waterfowl and other migratory bird species dependent of prairie wetland and grassland habitats
- Conserve, manage, and restore the diversity and viability of native fish, wildlife and plant populations associated with tallgrass prairie and prairie wetlands
- Work in partnership with others to restore or enhance native tallgrass prairie, prairie wetlands and unique plant communities
- Restore, enhance, and protect water quality and quantity that approach natural hydrologic functions
- Provide for compatible wildlife-dependent recreational uses by the public, emphasizing increased understanding of the northern tallgrass prairie ecosystem and the mission of the National Wildlife Refuge System

== Wildlife ==
This prairie wetland complex hosts a great diversity of plant species. Of special interest is the federally threatened western prairie fringed orchid. Other communities found at the preserve include wet and mesic tallgrass prairie and gravel prairie, willow thickets, mixed prairie, sedge meadow, aspen woodlands and emergent marsh. Prairie species at Pembina Trail Preserve include prairie Junegrass, purple prairie clover, big and little bluestem and mat muhly.

When restored, Glacial Ridge will likely provide habitat for several of the same species present at Pembina Trail Preserve, which harbors more than 73 bird species, 35 butterfly species, 11 mammal species, three amphibian species and one reptile species. Birds like the sandhill crane, sharp-tailed grouse, upland sandpiper, northern harrier, marbled godwit, Wilson's phalarope, sora rail, marsh wren, and clay colored sparrow may soon find their habitat expanded at Glacial Ridge. In recent years, bald eagles, a peregrine falcon and a whooping crane have also been spotted. In 2007, a nesting pair of burrowing owls and their two owlets were sighted on a restored prairie. Whitetail deer, moose, and prairie grouse are present within the NWR. It has also become a major nesting and breeding area for waterfowl. The return of the greater prairie chicken is one of the goals of the refuge. Hunting is permitted within the boundaries of the refuge.
