= Waubay Wetland Management District =

Waubay Wetland Management District is located in the "Coteau des Prairies", or prairie hills region of South Dakota. It includes more than 300 waterfowl production areas (WPAs) in six counties of northeastern South Dakota: Clark, Codington, Day, Grant, Marshall, and Roberts. The WPAs range from 40 acres (16 ha) to more than 1,600 acres (650 ha) in size, comprising a total of 40,000 acres (160 km^{2}). WPAs provide vital wildlife habitat in a landscape of cropland and pasture.

Access to all WPAs is limited to foot traffic only. Grass parking lots are available at many of the larger WPAs to provide off-road parking. There are no facilities or designated hiking trails. WPAs tend to be used very heavily during hunting seasons, but they also provide wonderful opportunities to explore the natural areas of South Dakota at other times of the year.

Waubay Wetland Management District includes the first waterfowl production area - McCarlson WPA, acquired in January 1959 from Arnold and Lydia McCarlson.

== Gallery ==
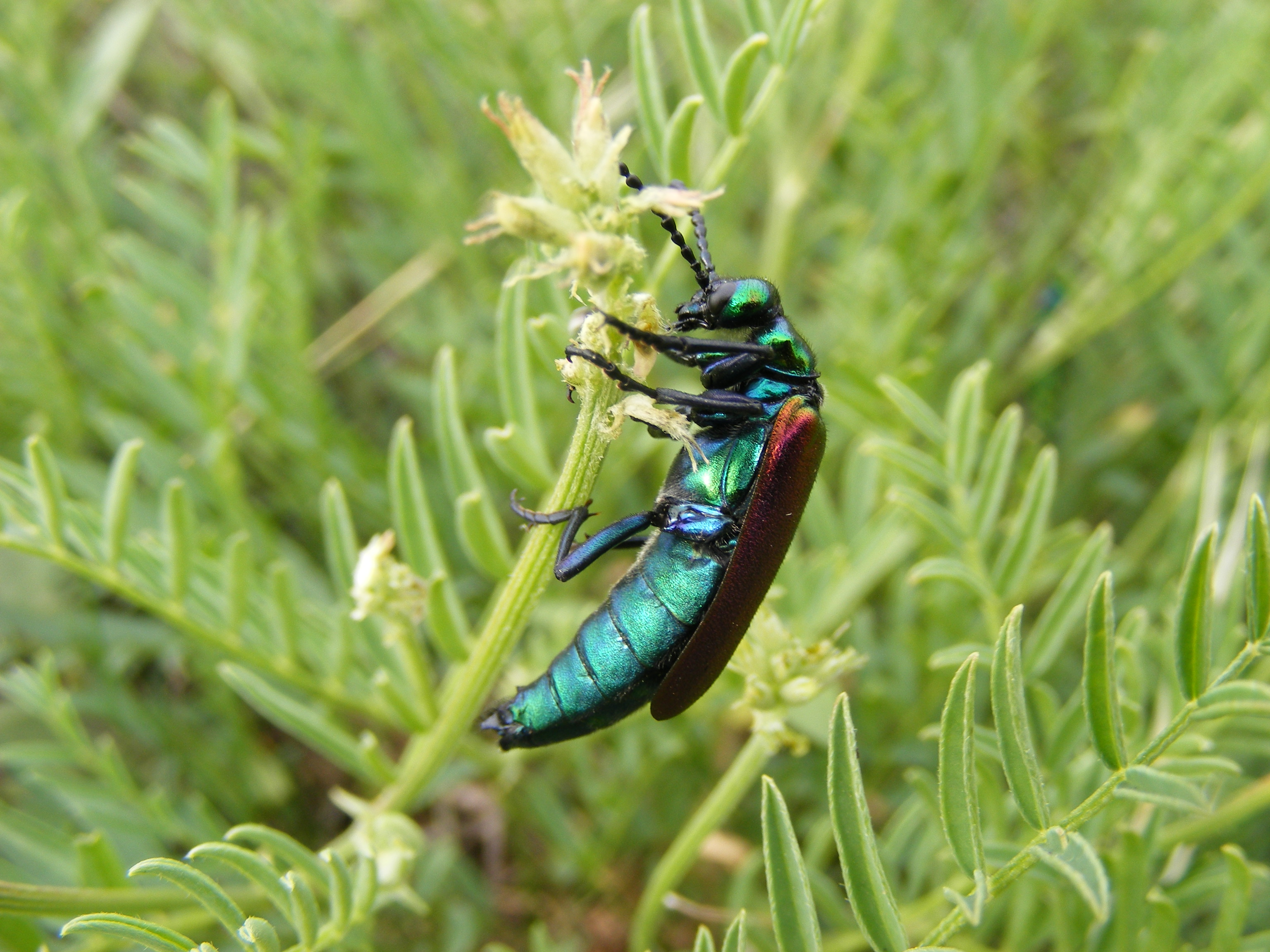
Lytta nuttalli (Nutall's blister beetle) on milkvetch at Waterfowl Production Area in Waubay Wetland Management District

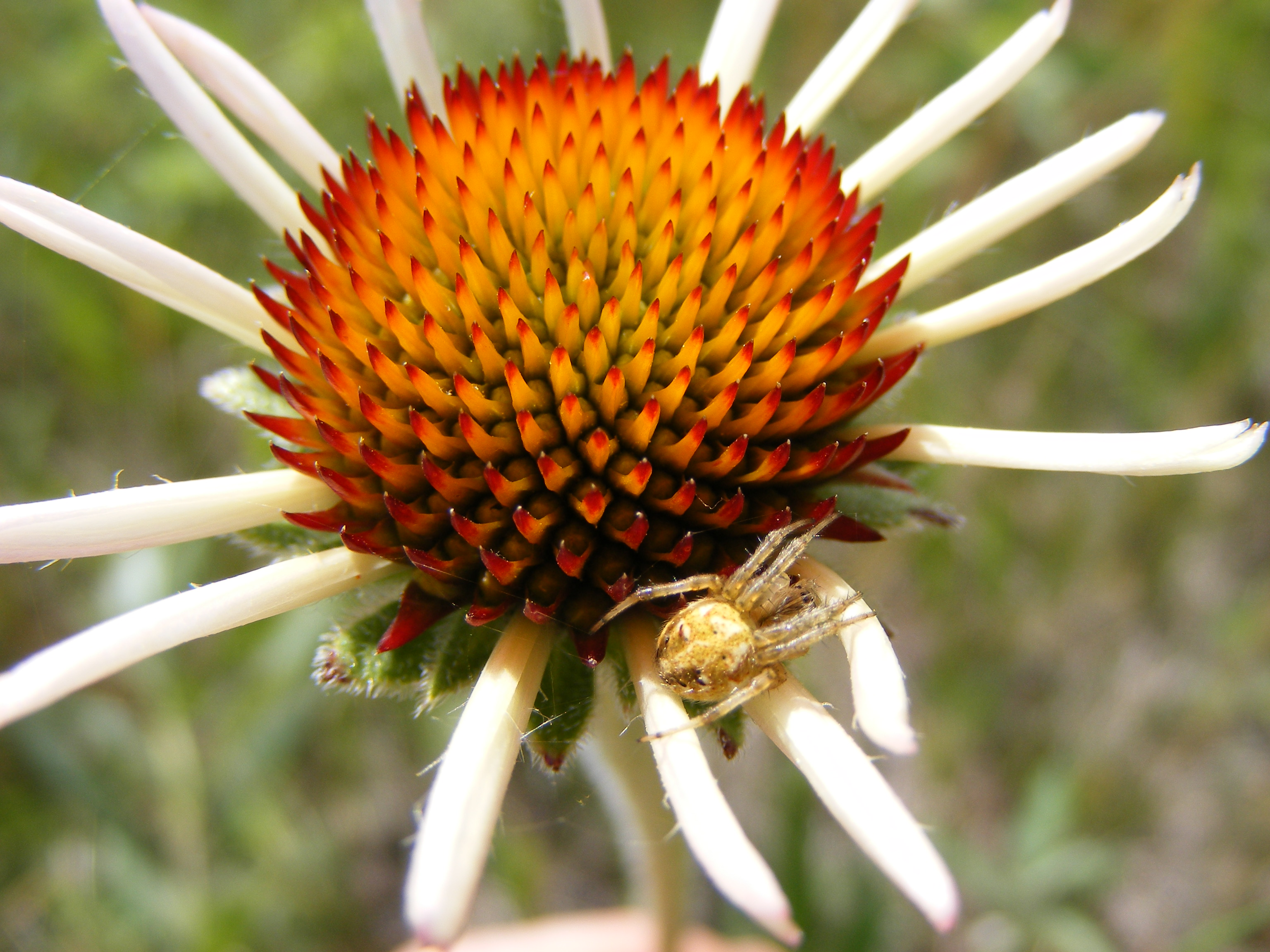
A spider waits on a purple coneflower for an unsuspecting victim at Lake Emma WPA

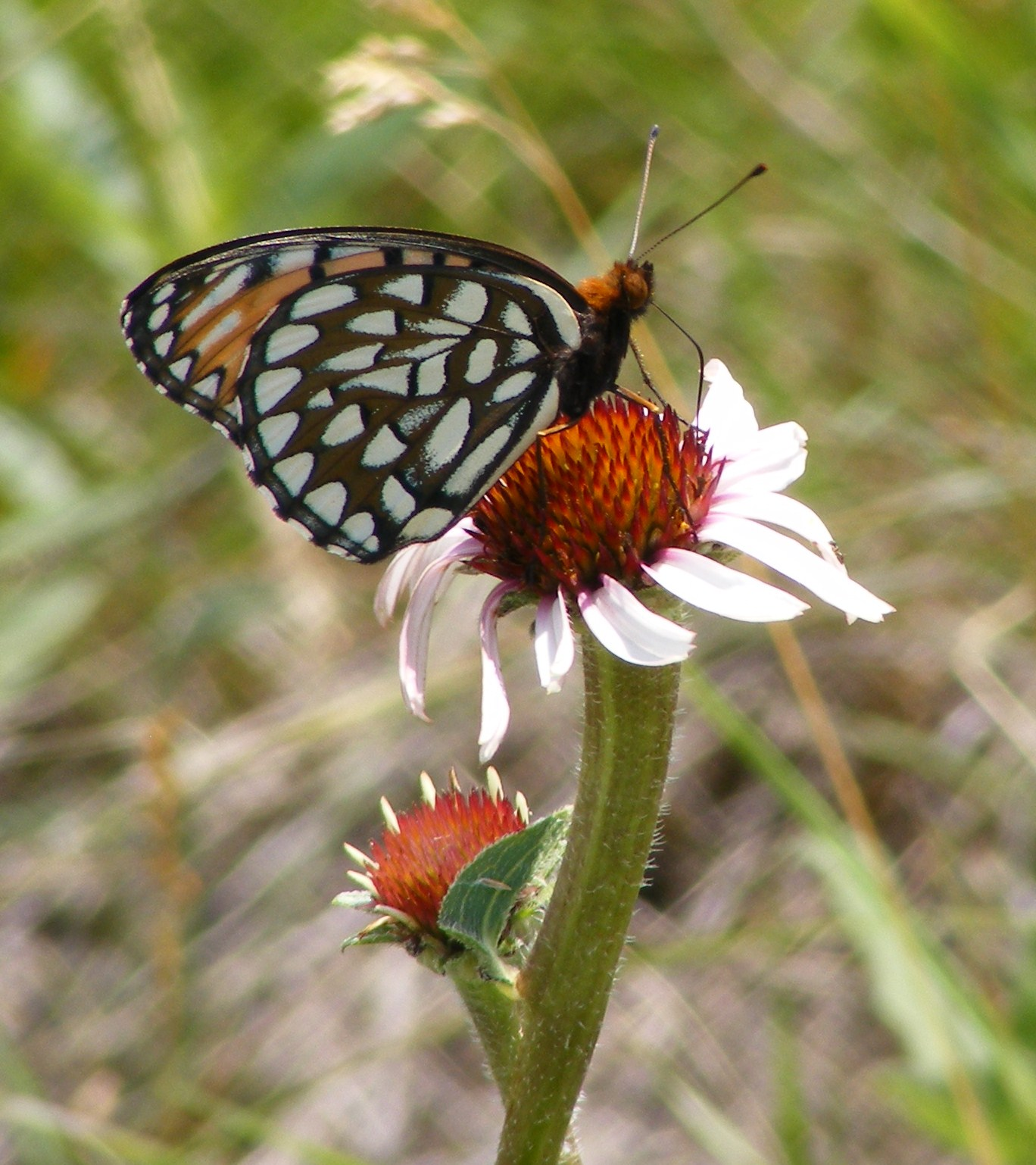
A regal fritillary (Speyeria idalia) gets a meal from a purple coneflower (Echinacea angustifolia) at Lake Emma WPA in Waubay Wetland Management

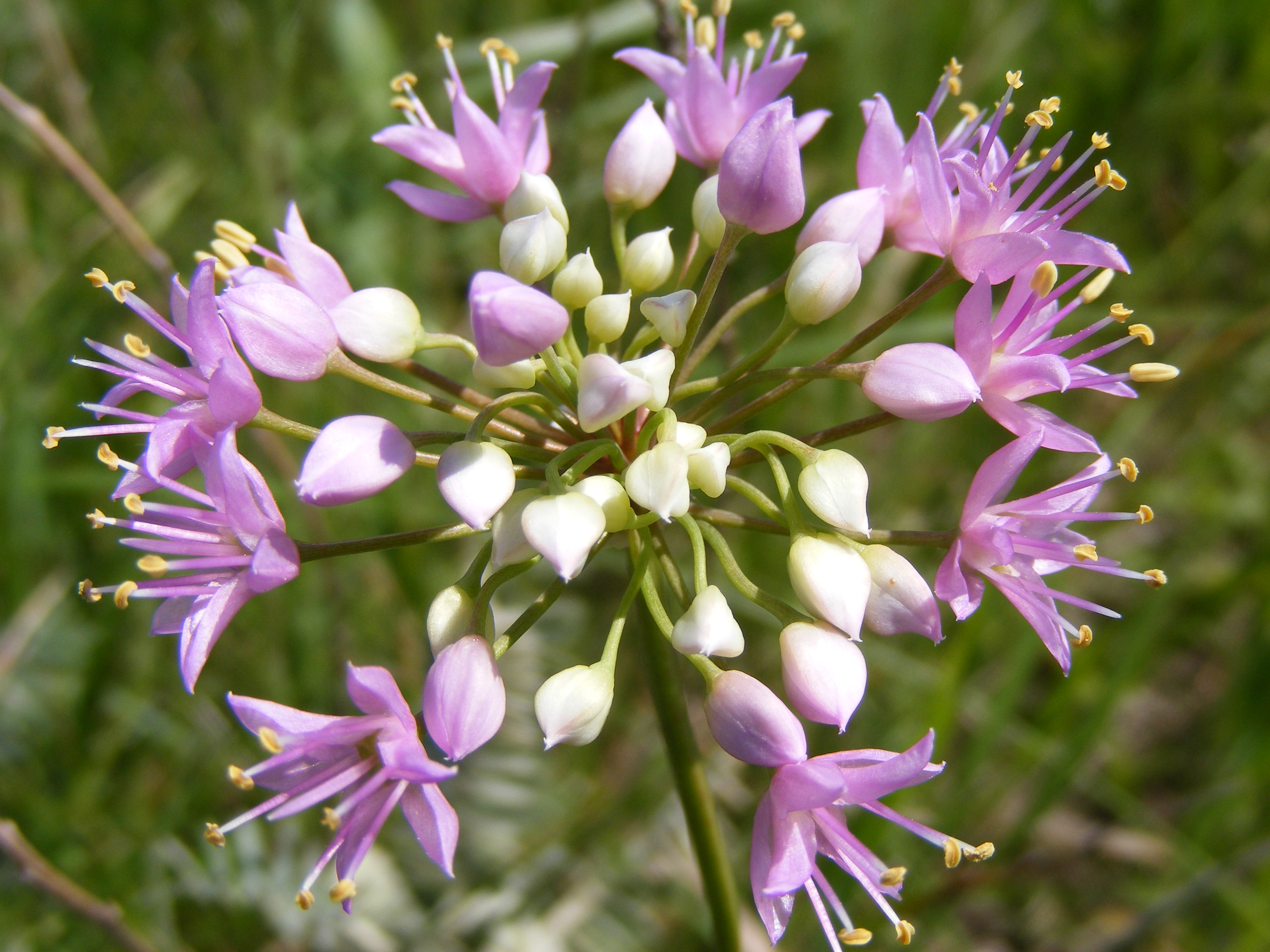
A pink wild onion (Allium stellatum) — blooms in the tallgrass prairie of Waubay Wetland Management District
