= Huron Wetland Management District =

Wildlife refuge in South Dakota

- IUCN category IV (habitat/species management area)
- Location within South Dakota Location within the United States
- Location: South Dakota, United States
- Nearest city: Huron, South Dakota
- Coordinates: 44°24′22″N 98°25′2″W
- Area: 17,518 acres (7,089 ha)
- Established: May 31, 1992
- Governing body: U.S. Fish and Wildlife Service
- Website: Huron Wetland Management District

Huron Wetland Management District is located in the U.S. state of South Dakota and includes 17,518 acres (70.89 km^{2}). The refuge borders the Missouri River on the east and is managed by the U.S. Fish and Wildlife Service. Huron WMD covers eight counties in east-central South Dakota. The topography of this area ranges from flat, gently rolling drift prairie to the Missouri Coteau hills in the western end of the district. The district lies in the midst of the Prairie Pothole Region.

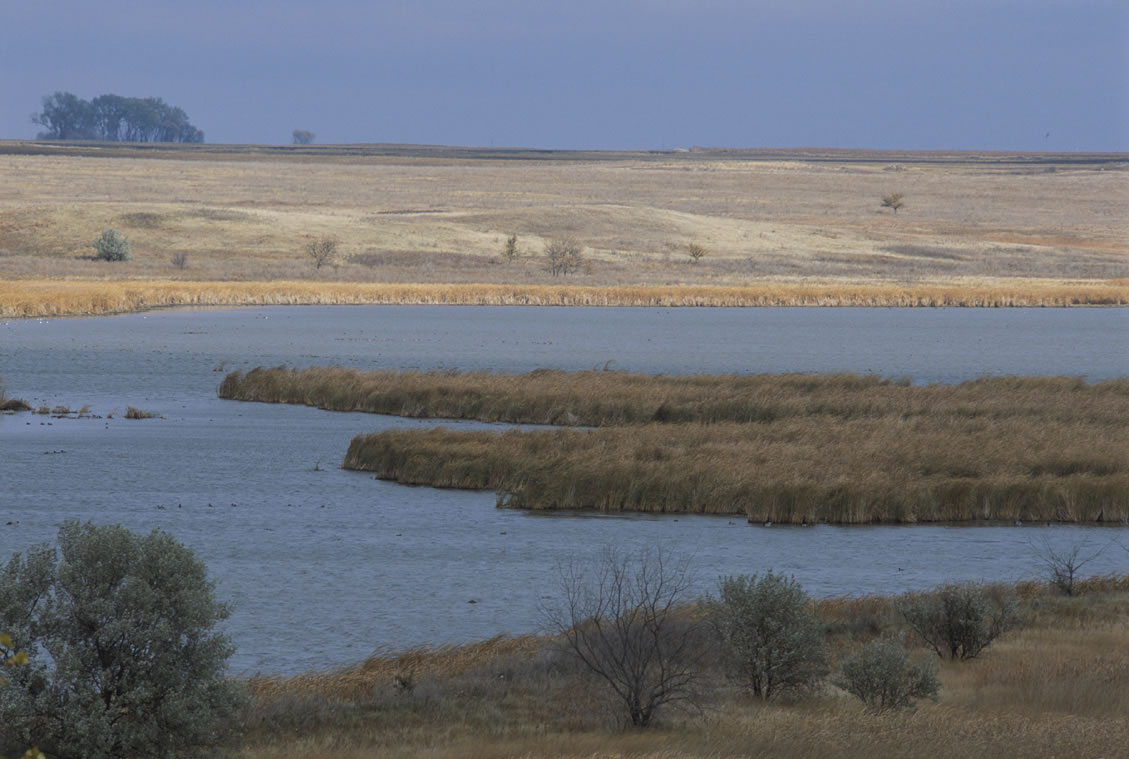
Wetlands in Huron WMD

The refuge consists of numerous lakes and what are known as waterfowl production areas. There are 60 waterfowl production areas in total, mostly near lakes, ponds and along riverways. Hundreds of thousands of migratory birds pass through the managed area every spring and fall. Roughly half of the migratory birds spend their summer nesting within the refuge. Five species of non-migratory birds are found within the district. Ring-necked pheasants, though an introduced species, are abundant, as is the sharp-tailed grouse are common, while greater prairie chicken, wild turkey, and gray partridge are less common. The blue-winged teal is the most common migratory duck species found in the district, but mallards and northern shovelers as well as numerous other duck species also have been observed. Snow geese are frequently seen in the spring and fall while the great blue heron and double crested cormorant are known to have rookeries within the district. The endangered whooping crane and interior least tern as well as the threatened piping plover are the endangered and threatened bird species that have been recorded in the district.

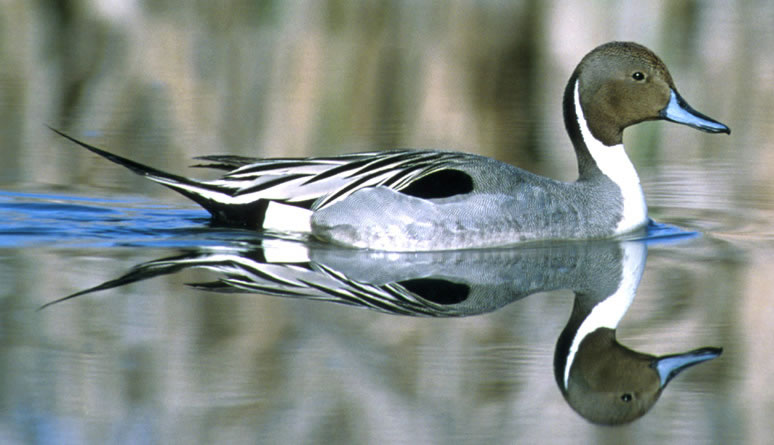
Northern pintail

Red-tailed hawk, Swainson's hawk, northern harrier, American kestrel, great horned owl as well as less frequent sightings of bald and golden eagles have been documented as raptors known to frequent the district.

Various mammal species also thrive here, including the pronghorn, white-tailed deer, mule deer, coyote, badger, beaver and mink, and are relatively common.

Fish species such as the yellow perch, northern pike and a variety of smaller non-game fish species thrive in the abundant ponds and waterways, providing a major source of food for many of the migratory bird species. The leopard frog, Great Plains toad, tiger salamander and prairie rattlesnake all have been documented as common in the district. The refuge allows fishing and hunting in limited areas and in season.
