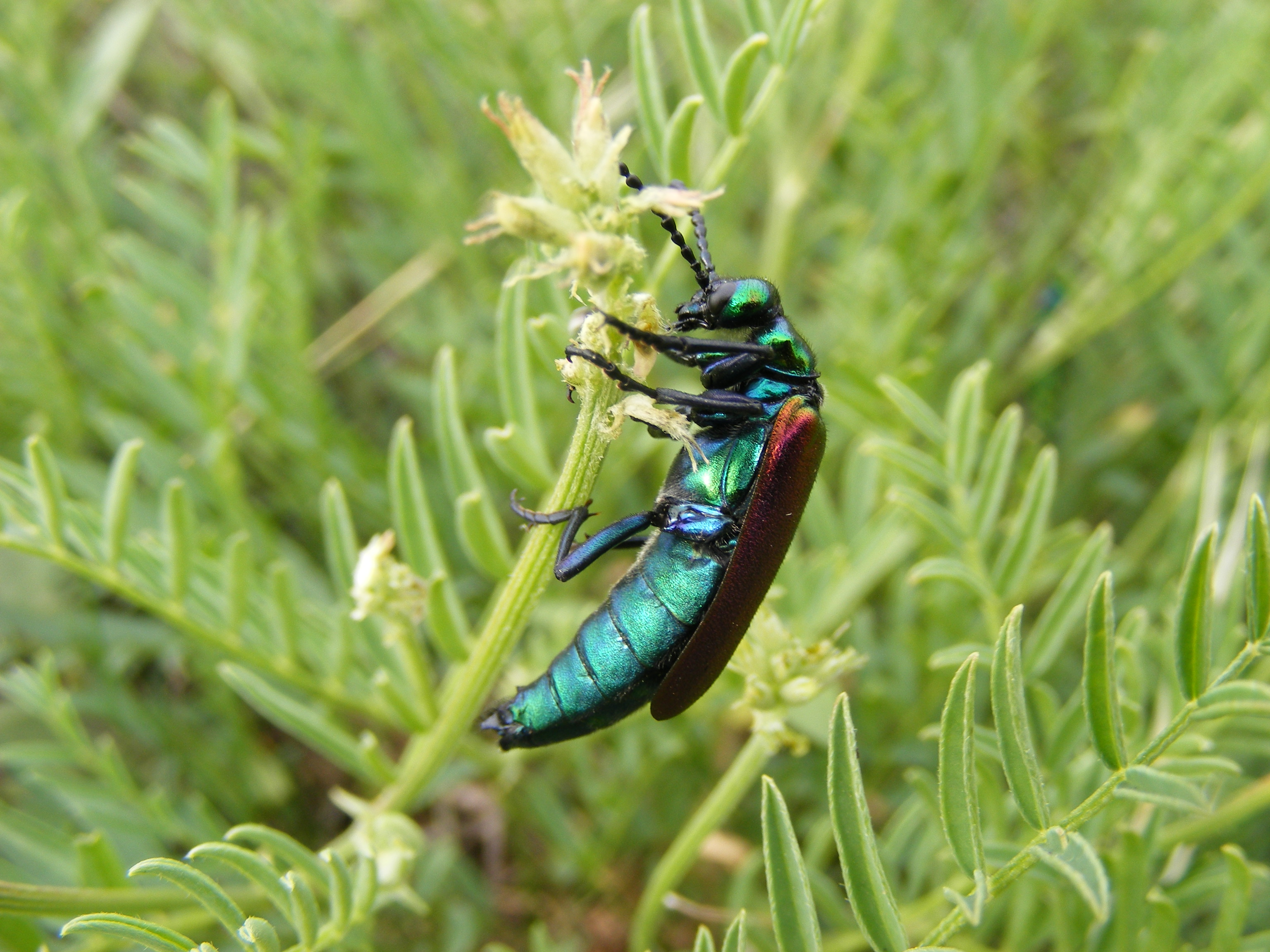
- Nuttall's blister beetle on a milkvetch plant at Waterfowl Production Area in Waubay Wetland Management District, SD

Scientific classification
- Kingdom: Animalia
- Phylum: Arthropoda
- Clade: Pancrustacea
- Class: Insecta
- Order: Coleoptera
- Suborder: Polyphaga
- Infraorder: Cucujiformia
- Family: Meloidae
- Genus: Lytta
- Species: L. nuttalli

Binomial name
- Lytta nuttalli Say, 1824

= Lytta nuttalli =

Species of beetle

Lytta nuttalli, or Nuttall's blister beetle, is a species of North American beetle first described in 1824 by Thomas Say. The genus Lytta is from a Latin word suggesting madness The specific nuttallii recognizes the contributions of Thomas Nuttall, a contemporary of Say.

The brilliant purple and green iridescent exoskeleton of Nuttall's blister beetles are a sharp contrast to the prairie plants of their native habitat. This species is found in Canada (Alberta to Manitoba) and the United States (Idaho south to Arizona, east to Minnesota and New Mexico). A disjunct population exists in eastern California restricted to higher altitudes.

This species is one of over 3,000 species included in the family Meloidae or 'blister beetles'. Adult beetles of species in this family are able to synthesize an irritating chemical 'cantharidin' that is used to deter predators.

The larvae of blister beetles in the genus Lytta feed in the nests of solitary bees in the family Apidae on the bee larvae and the food stored by the bee for its own larvae.

As adults, 'Nuttall's blister beetles' are known to feed in groups on green plants, particularly legumes. This behaviour can create problems for farmers when the beetles feed on soybeans, sweetclover, alfalfa, or other crops. Animals that eat the beetles in hay or forage may be poisoned by the beetles' chemical defense. The beetles are not considered a serious agricultural pest as their populations are naturally limited by their need for native ground nesting bees as larvae.
