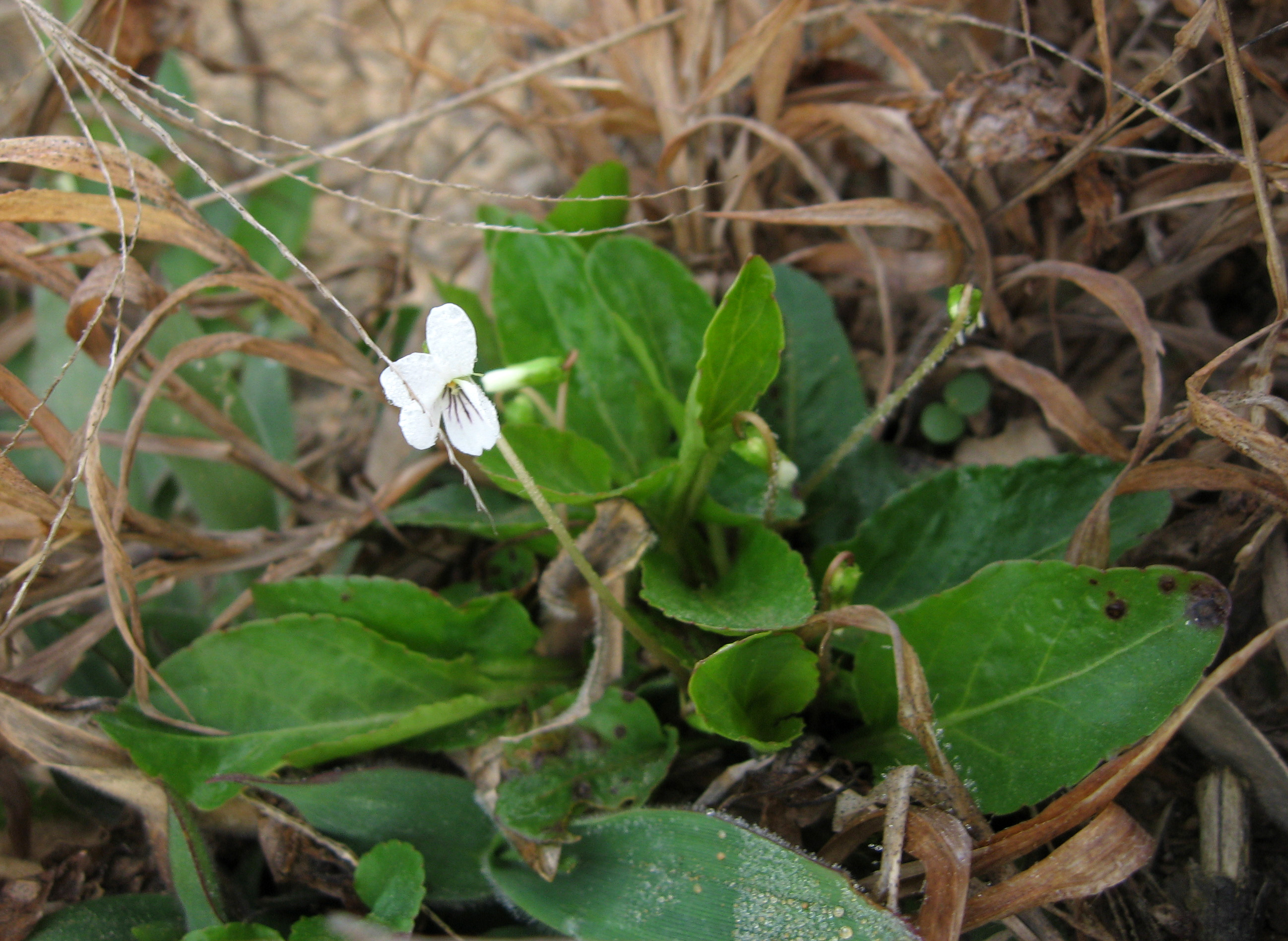

Scientific classification
- Kingdom: Plantae
- Clade: Embryophytes
- Clade: Tracheophytes
- Clade: Spermatophytes
- Clade: Angiosperms
- Clade: Eudicots
- Clade: Rosids
- Order: Malpighiales
- Family: Violaceae
- Genus: Viola
- Species: V. primulifolia

Binomial name
- Viola primulifolia L.

Varieties
- Viola primulifolia var. occidentalis A.Gray; Viola primulifolia var. primulifolia

= Viola primulifolia =

Species of flowering plant

Viola primulifolia, commonly called the primrose-leaf violet, is a species of flowering plant in the violet family. It is native to eastern North America, and possibly also to the Pacific Northwest. Its natural habitat is wet acidic areas that are usually at least semi-open.

It is a low, stemless perennial that produces white flowers in the spring. It can be distinguished from the similar-looking Viola lanceolata and Viola blanda by its leaves that are ovate, with rounded to truncate bases, and are 1.5-2 times as long as wide.

While typical Viola primulifolia occurs in a large area of the east, a variety of this species occurs in a small area of the Klamath Mountains in northwestern California and southwestern Oregon, under the name of V. primulifolia var. occidentalis. These populations, which are considered rare and highly localized, have alternatively been referred to as Viola lanceolata ssp. occidentalis.
