= Ojibway Prairie Complex =

Complex of parks and nature reserves in Windsor, Ontario, Canada

Coordinates: 42.257786°N 83.069118°W

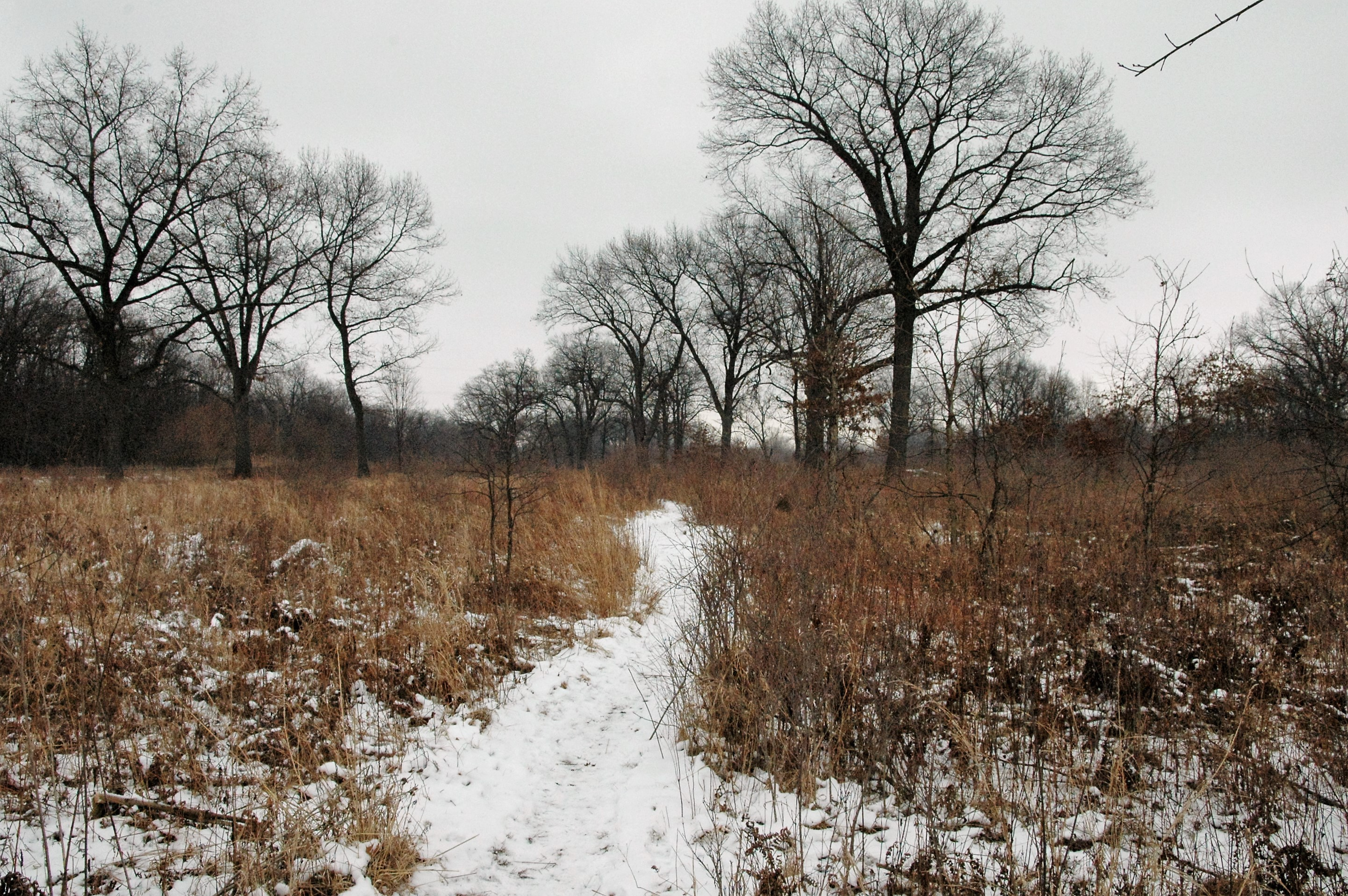
Oak savannah at Ojibway

The Ojibway Prairie Complex is a 350-hectare complex of parks and nature reserves on the west side of Windsor, Ontario, Canada. It comprises Ojibway Park, Tallgrass Prairie Heritage Park, Black Oak Heritage Park, and the Spring Garden Natural Area, owned and managed by the City of Windsor, as well as Ojibway Prairie Provincial Park, owned and managed by Ontario Parks. Other natural areas are present adjacent to these parks that are not currently protected.

The complex protects one of the largest remnants of tallgrass prairie and oak savannah in Ontario. These open habitats are present due to sandy soil over a bed of clay, which is less suitable for the growth of trees. The use of prescribed burns is important to manage these habitats. The complex is notable for its high diversity of plants and animals, including over 160 provincially rare species, more than any other site in Ontario. Several insect and plant species are not known from anywhere else in Ontario. Examples of protected species at risk found here include Butler's garter snake, eastern foxsnake, eastern prairie fringed orchid, and dense blazing star.

The Rt. Hon. Herb Gray Parkway, constructed between 2011 and 2015, runs just east of the complex. Natural habitats containing various species at risk were present in the area prior to construction, and various management and restoration activities have occurred to mitigate negative impacts.

The Ojibway Prairie Complex includes the Ojibway Nature Centre, which offers free exhibits, public education, and summer programmes for children.

== National Urban Park ==
In February 2022, Windsor West MP Brian Masse submitted a private member's bill in Parliament to have the Ojibway Prairie Complex considered by the Government of Canada for a new National Urban Park.

In April 2023, Ojibway Shores, the last natural coastline of the Detroit River, was transferred from the Windsor Port Authority to Parks Canada for inclusion in the potential NUP for $1.3 million. Previously, the WPA had been considering this land for an industrial site.

Lands considered for the NUP include Ojibway Park (Tom Joy Woods), Black Oak Heritage Park, Ojibway Shores, Spring Garden ESA, Ojibway Provincial Park, Tallgrass Prairie Heritage Park, and Oakwood Nature Area. Lands in the neighbouring town of LaSalle, such as Brunet Park and Stanton Woods, are also being considered.

In April 2024, Finance Minister Chrystia Freeland announced that $36.1 million of the 2024 Federal Budget were being set aside to create the Ojibway National Urban Park over the next five years.

== See also ==
- Parks in the city of Windsor, Ontario
- Ontario Parks
- List of Ontario parks
