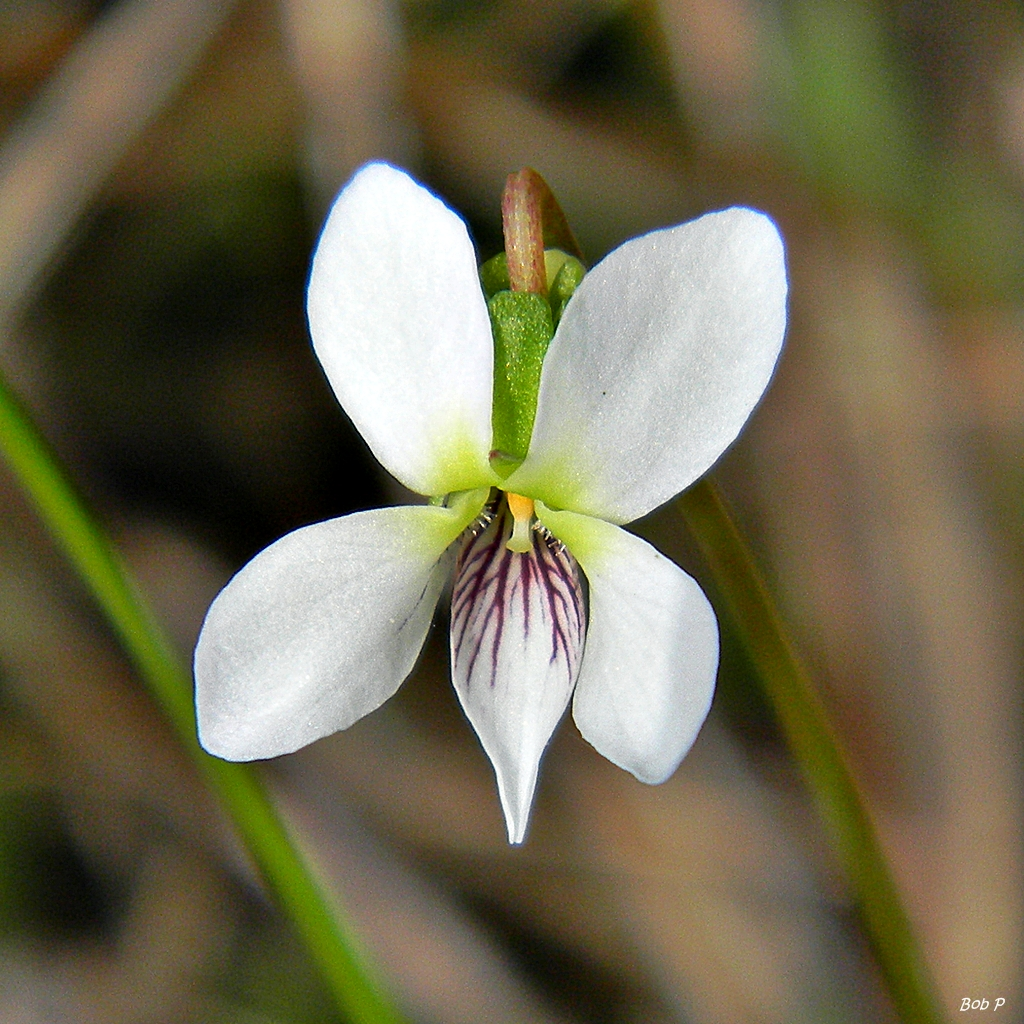
- Viola lanceolata flower

Conservation status
- Secure (NatureServe)

Scientific classification
- Kingdom: Plantae
- Clade: Embryophytes
- Clade: Tracheophytes
- Clade: Spermatophytes
- Clade: Angiosperms
- Clade: Eudicots
- Clade: Rosids
- Order: Malpighiales
- Family: Violaceae
- Genus: Viola
- Species: V. lanceolata

Binomial name
- Viola lanceolata L.
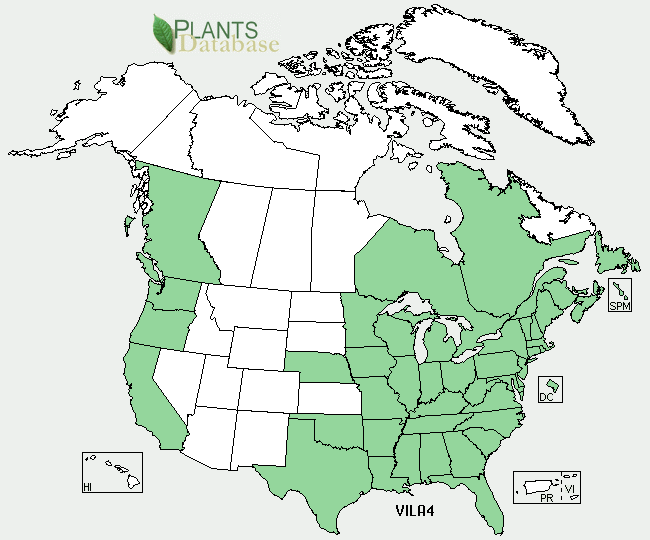
- Distribution of Viola lanceolata in North America

= Viola lanceolata =

Species of flowering plant

Viola lanceolata, commonly known as lance-leaved violet or bog white violet, is a species of stemless white-flowered violets. It is an ornamental plant in the Violaceae family, part of the genus Viola. It gets its name from its lanceolate leaf shape and from the habitats in which it thrives.

== Distribution ==
Viola lanceolata originates from North America and can be found in many states in the United States and in Canada. Its native status is L48 (N), CAN (N), and SPM (N).

== Habitat and ecology ==
Viola lanceolata can be found growing in bogs, swamps, wet meadows and along shores in sandy soil. It is a perennial plant that blooms between May and June. Viola lanceolata frequently hybridizes with northern white violet (Viola macloskeyi) to form primrose-leaved violet (Viola primulifolia). It grows in similar habitats but has leaves intermediate between lance shaped and the typical heart-shaped violet leaves of northern white violet.

== Morphology ==
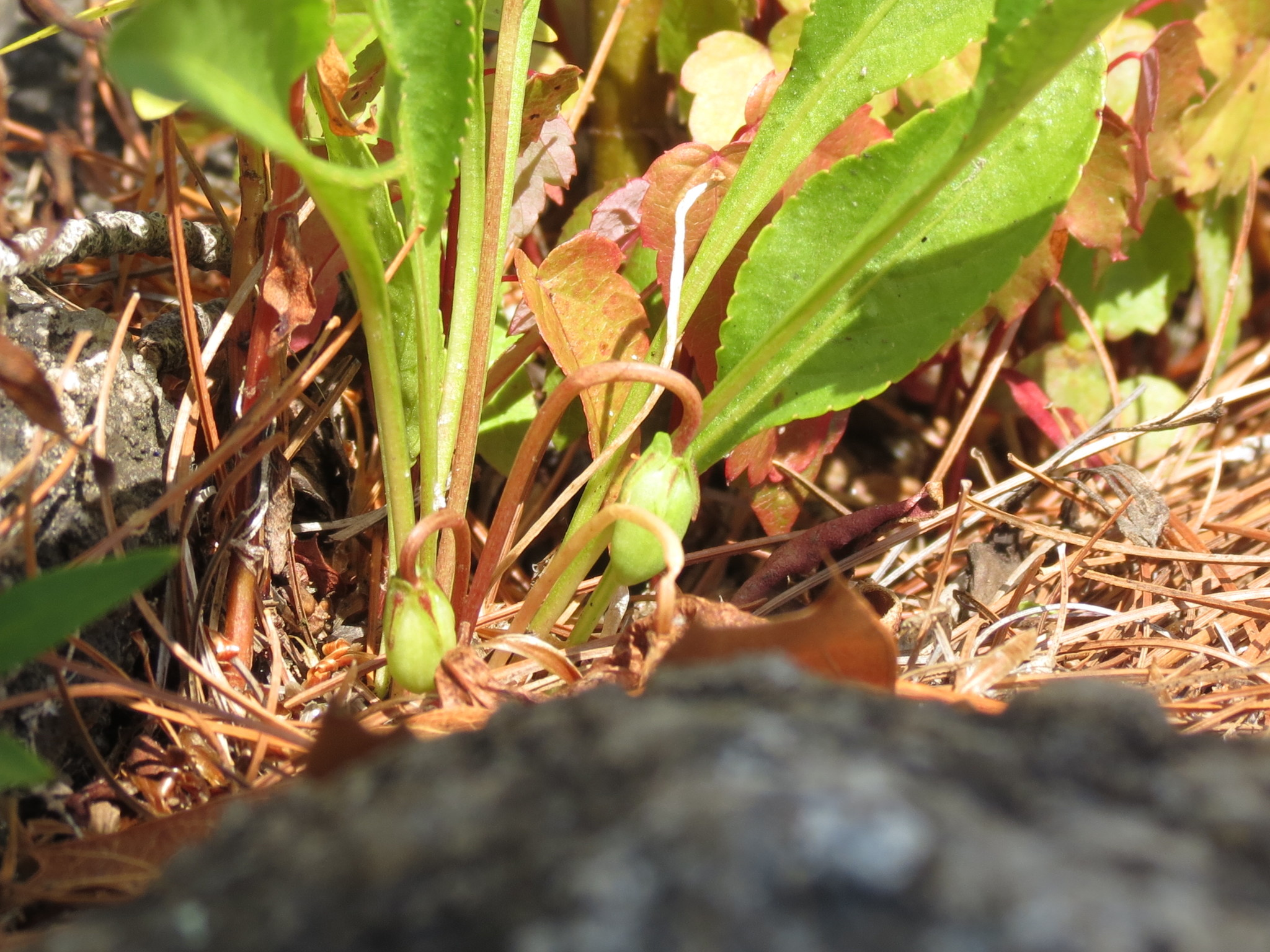
Cleistogamous flowers

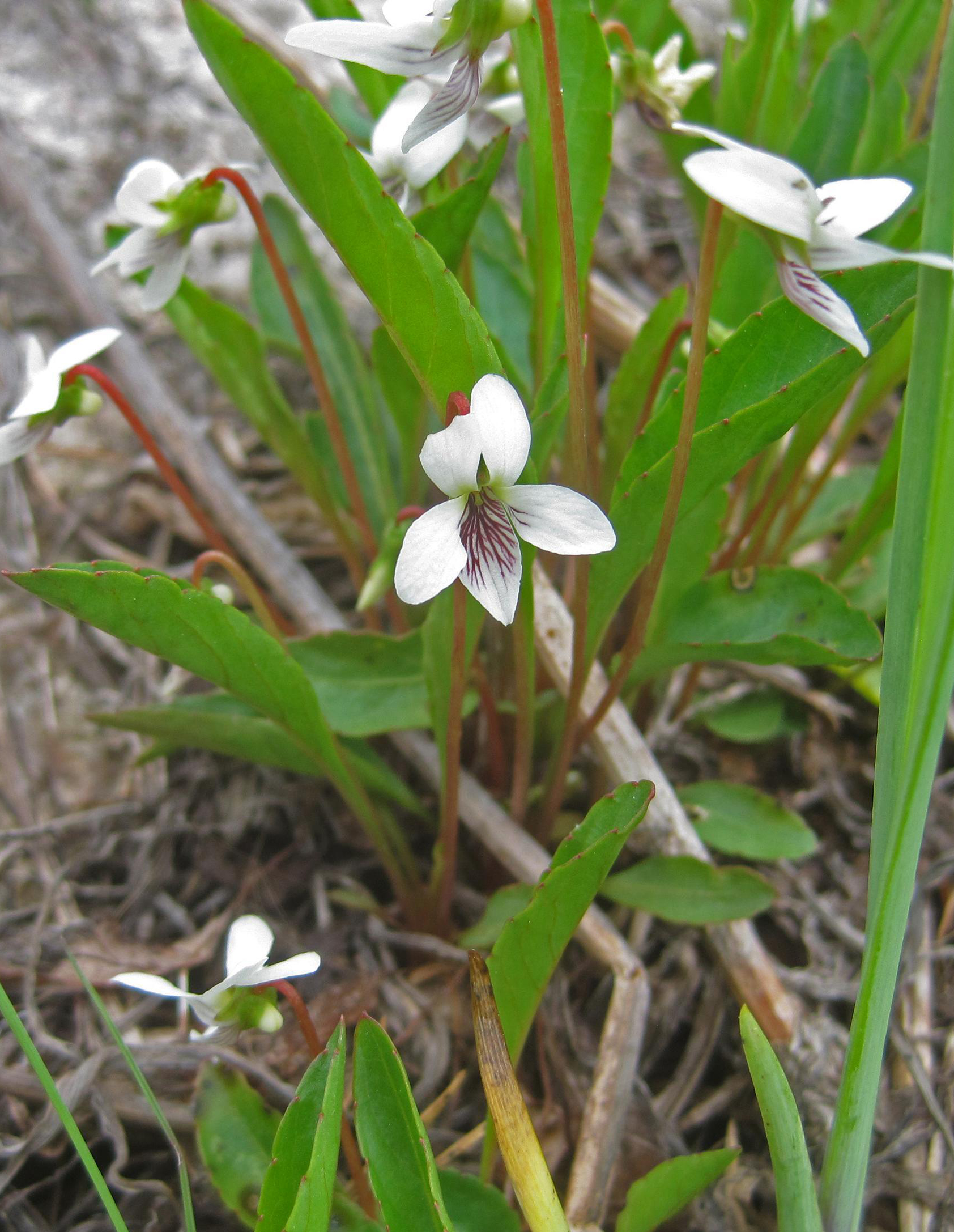
plant form

The overall plant is 10–15 cm (4–6 in) tall and has narrow, lance-shaped leaves. These leaves are sometimes wider in the summer than in the spring and have generally smooth surfaces. Its stem is smooth and slender. Its flower contain 5 white petals located at the top of the stalk. The bottom three petals typically have purple veins. This plant spreads with root-like structures that grow over the surface of the ground (stolons). Its growth habit is a forb/herb.

== Fruits ==
The fruit that it bears are green elliptical shaped capsules about a quarter-inch long containing many small round seeds that ripen to dark brown.
