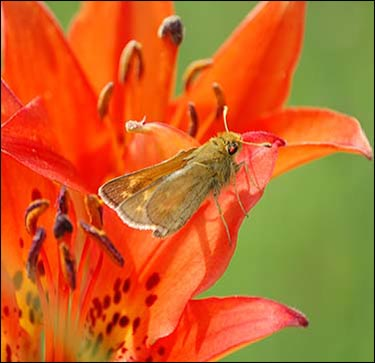

Conservation status
- Endangered (IUCN 3.1)

Scientific classification
- Kingdom: Animalia
- Phylum: Arthropoda
- Clade: Pancrustacea
- Class: Insecta
- Order: Lepidoptera
- Family: Hesperiidae
- Genus: Hesperia
- Species: H. dacotae

Binomial name
- Hesperia dacotae (Linnaeus, 1758)

= Hesperia dacotae =

Dakota skipper

Species of butterfly

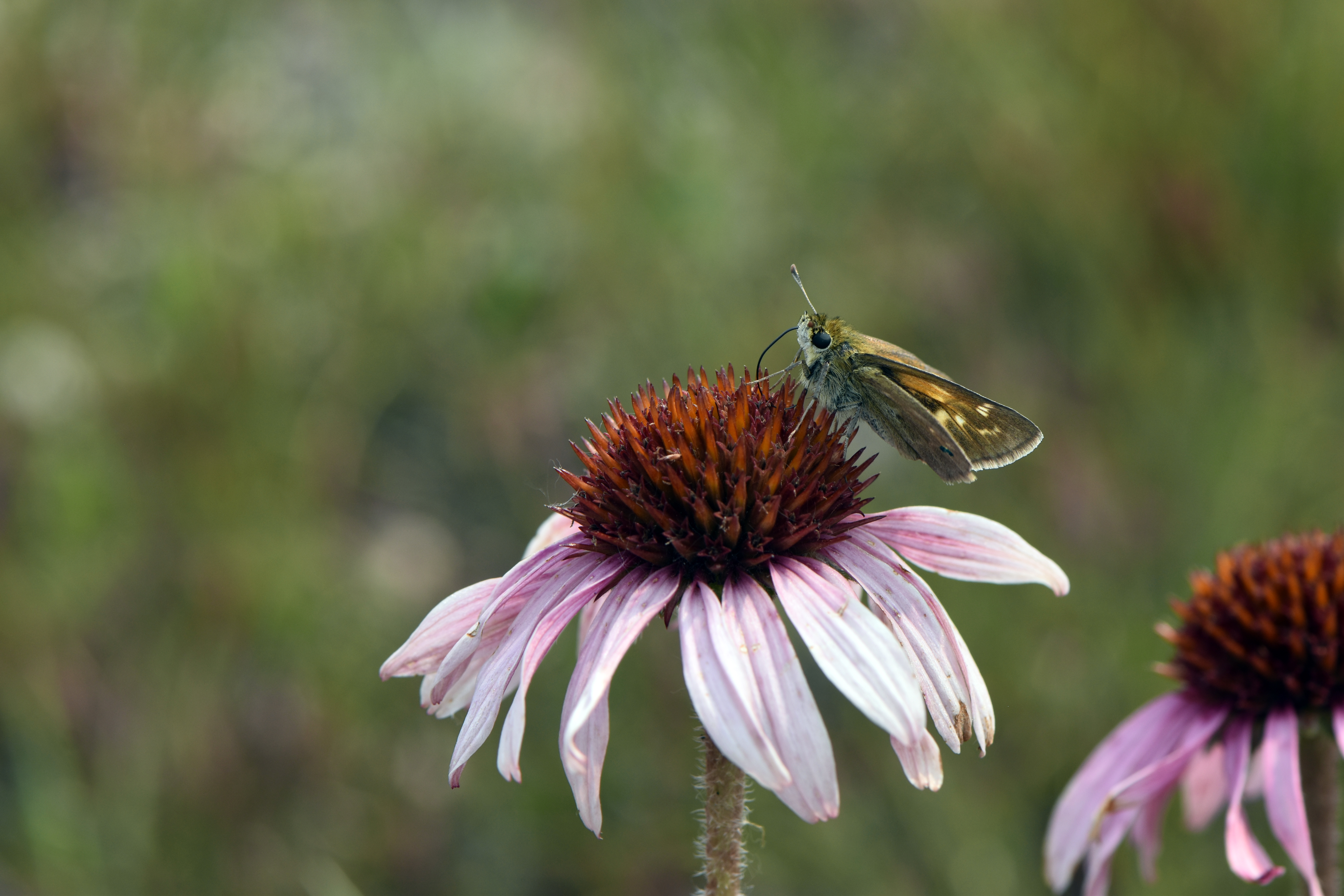
Dakota skipper on purple coneflower

Hesperia dacotae, the Dakota skipper, is a small to medium-sized North American butterfly. It has a wingspan of approximately 2.4–3.2 cm (0.9–1.3 in) and the antennae form a hook. The male's wings are a tawny-orange to brown on the forewings with a prominent mark and dusty yellow on the lower part of the wing. The female wing is a darker brown orange and white spots on the forewing margin.

== Reproduction ==
The adult Dakota skippers are active for only three weeks in June and July. Potentially lifetime fecundity is 180–250 eggs per female, although realized fecundity depends on lifespan. Their eggs, which are laid on the underside of leaves, are hatched in July and the caterpillar larvae feed on native grass until they go dormant in late summer. The caterpillar larvae then winter in shelters very close to the ground. In spring they come out of dormancy in their adult form. They are found in healthy natural tall grass and prairie grass from Minnesota to Saskatchewan. They are now considered extirpated from Illinois and Iowa. The largest most stable population is now found in North Dakota.

== Nectar plants ==
Important nectar plants depend on habitat. Commonly used nectar plants include black-eyed Susan (Rudbeckia hirta) and purple coneflower (Echinacea angustifolia). Other reported nectar plants include white prairie clover (Dalea candida), blanketflower (Gaillardia aristata), prairie milkvetch (Astragalus laxmannii), and hoary vervain (Verbena stricta). While native forbs are the primary nectar source, the Dakota skipper has been observed nectaring occasionally from non-native white sweetclover (Melilotus alba).

== Host plants ==
Larvae can feed on several native grass species. They often feed on little bluestem (Schizachyrium scoparium). Non-native smooth brome (Bromus inermis) and Kentucky bluegrass (Poa pratensis) are unsuitable host plants and can displace native grasses.

== Conservation ==
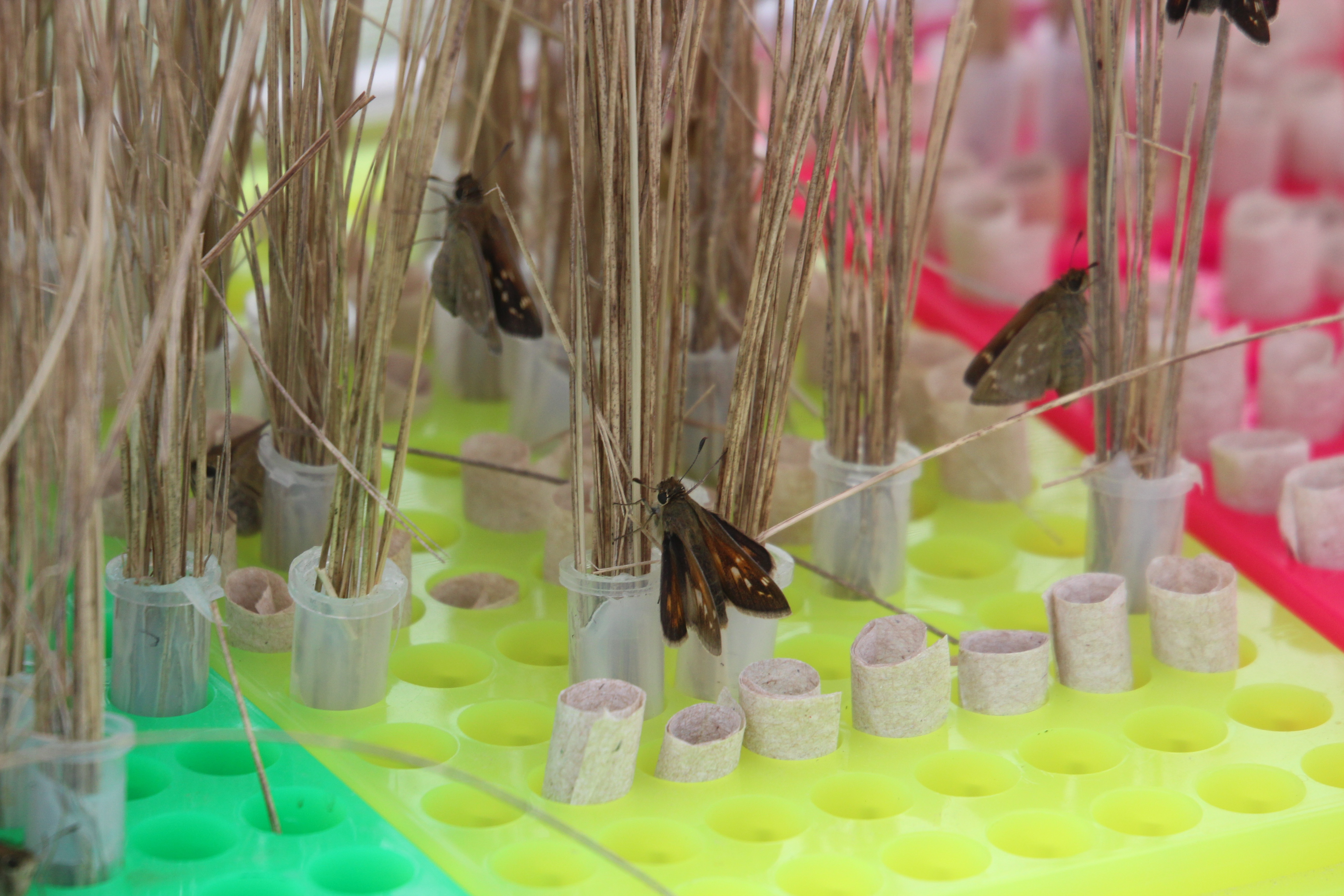
Captive reared Dakota skippers ready to be released

The Dakota skipper has experienced declining populations from destruction and modification of native prairie for grazing, herbicide use and building. The U.S. Fish and Wildlife Service placed the Dakota skipper on the Candidate list for protections under the Endangered Species Act from 1975 to 2014, and it has been petitioned twice for protection under the Endangered Species Act in 1994 and 2003. The Dakota skipper was awarded Threatened status under the Endangered Species Act in 2014.

The Minnesota Zoo runs a rearing and breeding program to reintroduce Dakota skippers and re-establish populations.

Many factors influence Dakota skipper populations. Habitat loss and pesticides are major threats, affecting 71% and 58% of metapopulations, respectively. Grazing, haying, and fire can be beneficial for maintaining habitat, but because Dakota skipper populations are small and isolated, these disturbances may instead be detrimental. More research is needed to understand how climate change may affect populations.
