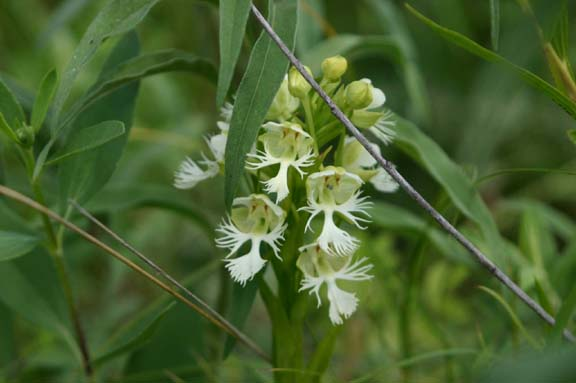

Conservation status
- Endangered (IUCN 3.1)

Scientific classification
- Kingdom: Plantae
- Clade: Tracheophytes
- Clade: Angiosperms
- Clade: Monocots
- Order: Asparagales
- Family: Orchidaceae
- Subfamily: Orchidoideae
- Genus: Platanthera
- Species: P. praeclara

Binomial name
- Platanthera praeclara Sheviak & M.L.Bowles

Synonyms
- Habenaria leucophaea var. praeclara (Sheviak & M.L.Bowles) Cronquist; Fimbriella praeclara (Sheviak & M.L.Bowles) Szlach. & Rutk.

= Platanthera praeclara =

Species of orchid

Platanthera praeclara, known as the western prairie fringed orchid and the Great Plains white fringed orchid, is a rare and threatened species of orchid native to North America.

== Distribution ==
Historically, Platanthera praeclara was found in tallgrass prairies west of the Mississippi River. It occurred from extreme southern Canada south to northeast Oklahoma. In Oklahoma, historical records (1975) exist for Craig and Rogers Counties.

Currently, extant populations of the orchid are found in Iowa, Kansas, Manitoba, Minnesota, Missouri, Nebraska, and North Dakota.

== Description ==
Platanthera praeclara arises from a fleshy tuber. It grows from 38 to 85 centimeters (1 ft 3 in to 2 ft 9 in) tall. Each plant can have up to two dozen or more flowers arranged in a stalk. P. praeclara is distinguished from Platanthera leucophaea, the eastern prairie fringed orchid, by its slightly larger flowers, petal shape, and longer nectar spur.

Platanthera praeclara is a long-lived perennial. It emerges in May and blooms in June or in July further north. The flowers are fragrant at night and are pollinated by large sphinx moths. P. praeclara is a plant of the tallgrass prairie and requires direct sunlight for growth. It is most often found in moist habitats or sedge meadows. P. praeclara has persisted in areas that have been lightly grazed, periodically burned, or regularly mowed. It is not yet understood how these activities affect plant survival. It may be that removal of dead grass mulch is beneficial, but heavy grazing is detrimental.

== Conservation ==
The plant has been listed as a threatened species in the United States since 1989, and in 2008 it was listed as an endangered species by the International Union for Conservation of Nature.

The major factor contributing to the decline of P. praeclara has been the conversion of native prairie to croplands. Fire suppression, overgrazing, and habitat fragmentation also have contributed to the decline of the species.

The species was listed as endangered in Canada in 2003. The Canadian population is considered relatively stable though limited to a small geographic area. The Nature Conservancy of Canada has protected habitat for 25% of the global population of Western Prairie Fringed Orchid.
