= Tallgrass prairie =

Ecosystem native to central North America

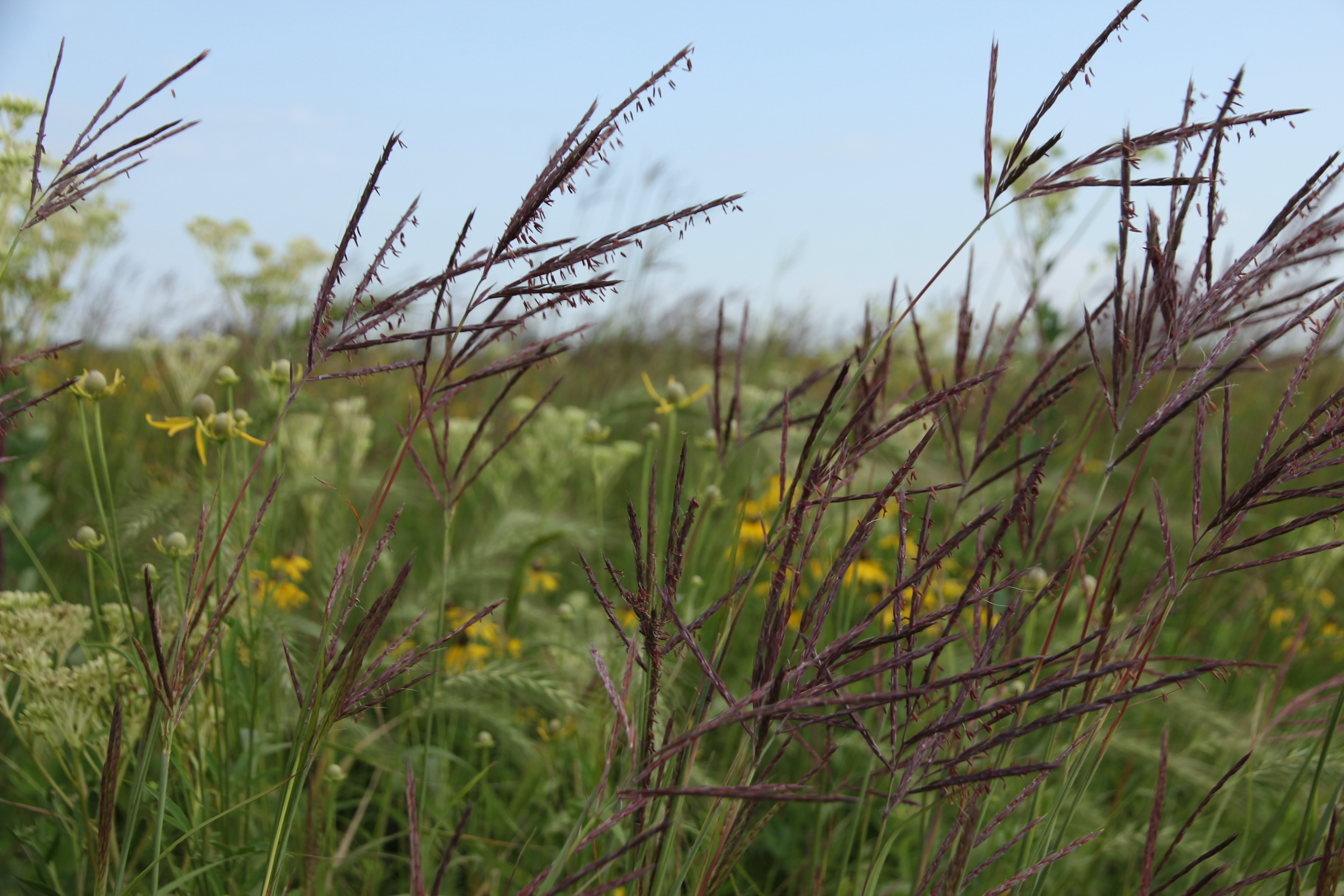
Flowering big bluestem, a characteristic tallgrass prairie plant

The tallgrass prairie is an ecosystem native to central North America. Historically, natural and anthropogenic fire, as well as grazing by large mammals (primarily bison) provided periodic disturbances to these ecosystems, limiting the encroachment of trees, recycling soil nutrients, and facilitating seed dispersal and germination. Prior to widespread use of the steel plow, which enabled large scale conversion to agricultural land use, tallgrass prairies extended throughout the American Midwest and smaller portions of southern central Canada, from the transitional ecotones out of eastern North American forests, west to a climatic threshold based on precipitation and soils, to the southern reaches of the Flint Hills in Kansas, to a transition into forest in Manitoba.

They were characteristically found in parts of the upper Mississippi River Valley, in the central forest-grasslands transition, the central tall grasslands, the upper Midwest forest-savanna transition, and the northern tall grasslands ecoregions. They flourished in areas with rich loess soils and moderate rainfall around 30-35 inches (700–900 mm) per year. To the east were the fire-maintained eastern savannas. In the northeast, where fire was infrequent and periodic windthrow represented the main source of disturbance, beech-maple forests dominated. In contrast, shortgrass prairie was typical in the western Great Plains, where rainfall is less frequent, and soils are less fertile. Due to expansive agricultural land use, very little tallgrass prairie remains.

== History of origin and demise ==
Retreating glaciers deposited the parent material for soil in the form of till, i.e. unsorted sediment, about 10,000 years ago. Wind-dropped loess and organic matter accumulated, resulting in deep levels of topsoil. Animals, such as bison, elk, deer, and rabbits, added nitrogen to the soil through urine and feces. Prairie dogs, a type of squirrel and considered to be a keystone species, dug tunnels, turning the soil and allowing water to travel several feet underground.

For 5,000 to 8,000 years, more than 240 million acres (970,000 km^{2}) of prairie grasslands were a major feature of the landscape. Between 1800 and 1930, the vast majority was destroyed. Settlers transformed what they named "the Great American Desert" or "The Inland Sea" into farmland. Major reasons for the prairie's demise were the confined grazing pattern of European cattle versus bison, the near-extermination of prairie dogs, and the plowing and cultivation of the land, which breached tallgrass root systems and interrupted reproduction. Furthermore, extensive tile drainage has changed the soil's water content and hydrodynamics, and ongoing soil erosion results in its increasing loss.

Estimates differ of how much original tallgrass prairie survives, ranging from less than 1% mostly in "scattered remnants found in pioneer cemeteries, restoration projects, along highways and railroad rights-of-way, and on steep bluffs high above rivers" to 4%.

== Ecosystem ==
Tallgrass prairie is capable of supporting significant biodiversity. According to the World Wildlife Fund, parts of the ecoregion are among the "top ten ecoregions for reptiles, birds, butterflies, and tree species. Tallgrass species are found in the understory layer." Oak, such as blackjack oak (Quercus marilandica) and post oak (Q. stellata), and hickory tree species occur in some areas, but generally in moderate densities. Bison (Bison bison) were a dominant species and present in large numbers.

The tallgrass prairie biome depends on prairie fires, a form of wildfire, for its survival and renewal. Tree seedlings and intrusive alien species without fire tolerance are eliminated by periodic fires. Fires may be started naturally, such as by lightning , or can be started by humans. Native Americans used fires to drive bison and improve hunting, travel, and visibility.

White-tailed deer fecal matter has nutrients for plant biodiversity in Tallgrass prairie area.

== Boundaries ==
Tallgrass prairie in relation to the Great Plains in the US. Shortgrass prairie Mixed grass prairie Tallgrass prairie

As its name suggests, the most famous members of the tallgrass prairie are tall warm-season grasses, such as indiangrass (Sorghastrum nutans), big bluestem (Andropogon gerardi), and switchgrass (Panicum virgatum), which average between 4.9 and 6.6 ft (1.5 and 2 m) tall, and little bluestem (Schizachyrium scoparium), which is typically up to 3.3 ft (1 m). Remnant prairies typically have a larger number of shorter grasses, such as prairie dropseed (Sporobolus heterolepis), porcupine grass (Hesperostipa spartea), and Leiberg's panic grass (Dichanthelium leibergii) in the Upper Midwest. Prairies also include a large percentage of forbs, such as lead plant (Amorpha spp.), prairie rosinweed (Silphium spp.), gayfeathers (Liatris spp.), sunflowers (Helianthus spp.), asters (Symphyotrichum spp.), coneflowers (Echinacea spp., and Rudbeckia spp.), and many other species.

Technically, prairies have less than 5–11% tree cover. A grass-dominated plant community with 10–49% tree cover is a savanna.

After the steel plow was invented by John Deere in 1833, this fertile soil became one of America's most important resources. Over 95% of the original tallgrass prairie is now farmland.

== Remnants ==
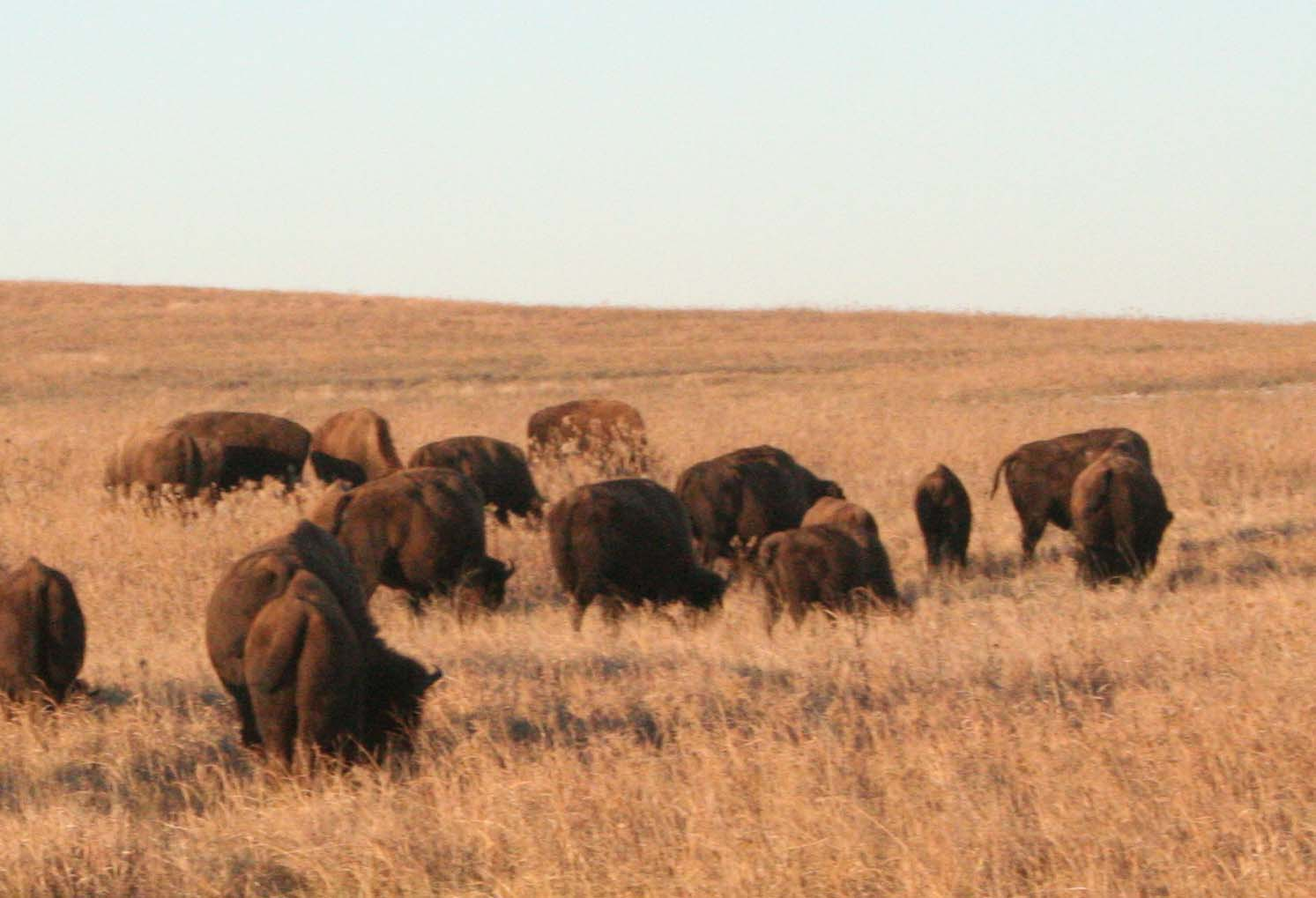
Bison grazing on the 158 km^{2} (39,000-acre) Tallgrass Prairie Nature Preserve in Osage County, Oklahoma

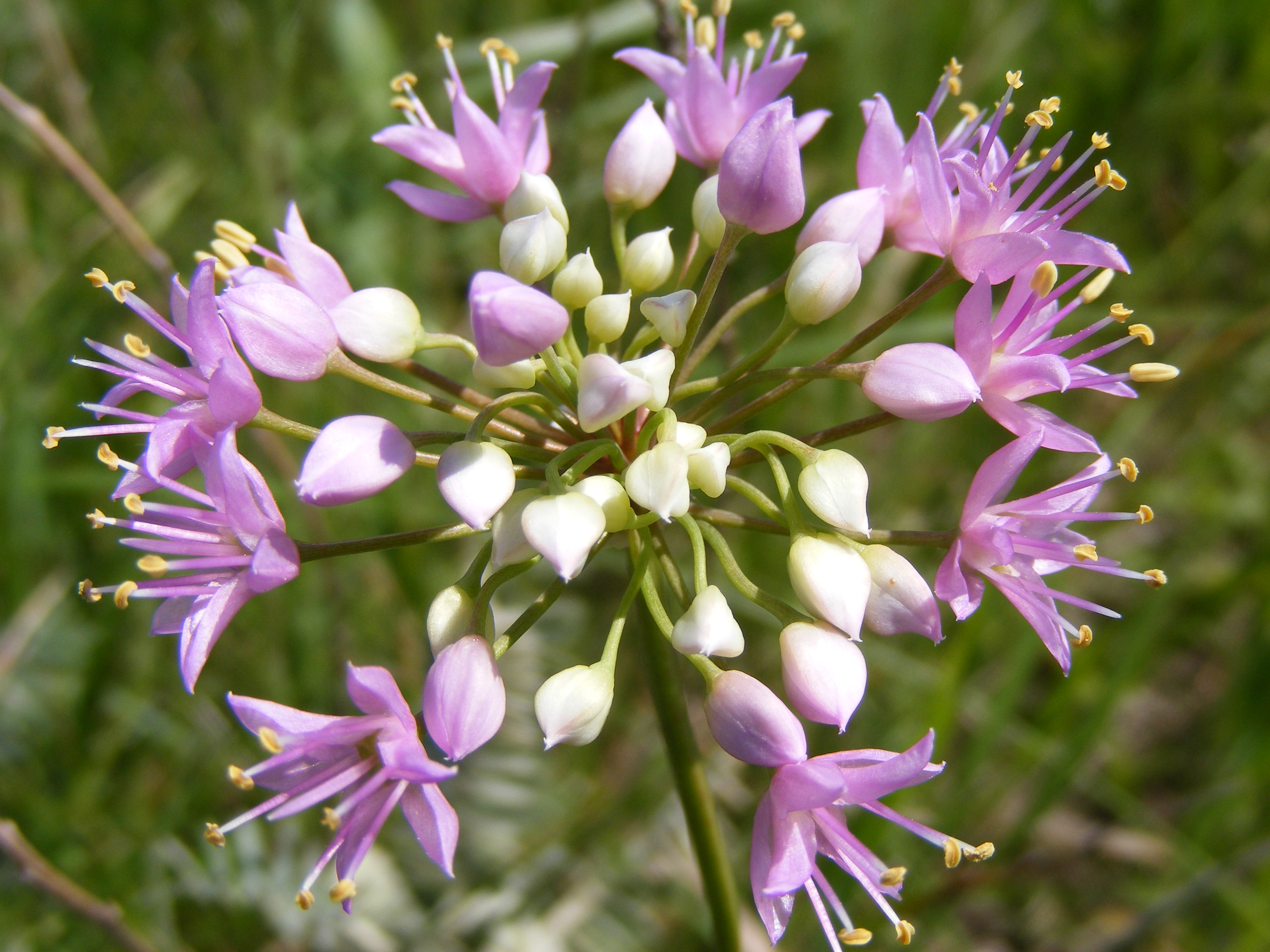
A pink wild onion (Allium stellatum) — blooms in the tallgrass prairie of Waubay Wetland Management District in South Dakota.

The tallgrass prairie survives in areas unsuited to plowing: the rocky hill country of the Flint Hills, which runs north to south through east-central Kansas; the eastern fringe of the Red River Valley (Tallgrass Aspen Parkland) in Manitoba and Minnesota; the Coteau des Prairies, which extends from South Dakota through Minnesota and into Iowa; and the far north portion of Oklahoma. In Oklahoma, the tallgrass prairie has been maintained by ranchers, who saw the hat-high grass as prime grazing area for cattle.

The 39,000-acre (158 km^{2}) Tallgrass Prairie Preserve in Osage County, Oklahoma, and the somewhat smaller 10,900-acre (44.1 km^{2}) Tallgrass Prairie National Preserve in Kansas, attempt to maintain this ecosystem in its natural form. They have reintroduced plains bison to the vast expanses of grass. Other U.S. preserves include Midewin National Tallgrass Prairie in Illinois, Broken Kettle Preserve and Neal Smith National Wildlife Refuge in Iowa, Konza Prairie in Kansas, and Prairie State Park in Missouri. In eastern North Dakota is Sheyenne National Grassland, the only national grassland on the tallgrass prairie. Also, several small tallgrass prairie reservations are in Cook County, Illinois, including the National Natural Landmark, Gensburg-Markham Prairie. Tallgrass prairie remnants can also be found among nature preserves in the Hobart Nature District, located in Hobart, Indiana, just outside of Chicago.

The original extent of tallgrass prairie in Canada was the 2,300-square-mile (6,000 km^{2}) plain in the Red River Valley, southwest of Winnipeg in Manitoba (see map). While most of Manitoba's tallgrass prairie has been destroyed through cultivation and urban expansion, relatively small areas persist. One of the largest blocks of remaining tallgrass prairie in Manitoba is protected by several conservation partners in a conservation area called the Tallgrass Aspen Parkland. The Manitoba Tall Grass Prairie Preserve, which occupies small portions of the municipalities of Stuartburn and Emerson – Franklin, forms a part of the Tallgrass Aspen Parkland. This preserve contains about 4,000 ha (9,900 acres) of tallgrass prairie, aspen parkland, and wetlands.

A small pocket of less than 1,200 acres (5 km^{2}) of tallgrass prairie remains in the southwest corner of Windsor, Ontario, protected by Ojibway Park, and Spring Garden Area of Natural Scientific Interest, along with the interconnected parks: Black Oak Heritage Park, Ojibway Prairie Provincial Nature Reserve, and the Tallgrass Prairie Heritage Park. Aside from the Provincial Nature Reserve, all are operated by the City of Windsor's Parks and Recreation.

== Restoration ==
Considered the birthplace of ecological restoration, the first tallgrass prairie restoration was the 1936 Curtis Prairie at the University of Wisconsin-Madison Arboretum. The UW Arboretum was the center of tallgrass prairie research through the first half of the 20th century, with the development of the nearby Greene Prairie, Aldo Leopold Shack and Farm and pioneering techniques like prescribed burning. The latter half of the 20th century saw the growth of tallgrass prairie restoration beyond Wisconsin borders, with projects in Illinois such as at Knox College, College of DuPage, Morton Arboretum, and Fermi National Laboratory, and projects in Iowa including Grinnell College's Conard Environmental Research Area. These major tallgrass restoration projects marked restoration's growth from isolated studies to widespread practice. Tallgrass prairie restoration efforts picked up wider public recognition in the 1980s, spurred by the publication of a book of appreciation, John Madson's Where the Sky Began: Land of the Tallgrass Prairie (1982). Nonprofit organizations throughout the former tallgrass prairie region began to reserve or restore small remnants of native prairie. For example, the Native Prairies Association of Texas was founded in 1986 to locate, restore, and protect prairies in Texas; the group currently protects about 2,780 acres (11.3 km^{2}) of Texas prairies.

The Midewin National Tallgrass Prairie, founded in 1996 near Elwood, Illinois, was, as of 2006, the largest tallgrass prairie restoration area in the United States. In Minnesota, Glacial Ridge National Wildlife Refuge was established in 2004. The core of the refuge is a preserved 5,000-acre (20 km^{2}) tallgrass prairie remnant, and an additional 30,000 acres (121 km^{2}) are either in the process of restoration or will be soon. According to The Nature Conservancy, so far, 100 wetlands have been restored, and 8,000 acres (32 km^{2}) of land has been seeded with native plant species.

Several books have been published on tallgrass prairie restoration, including:

- Packard, Stephen; Mutel, Cornelia F., eds. (1997). The Tallgrass Restoration Handbook: For Prairies, Savannas, and Woodlands. Island Press.
- Kurtz, Carl (2001). A Practical Guide to Prairie Reconstruction. University of Iowa Press.
- Helzer, Chris (2009). The Ecology and Management of Prairies in the Central United States. University of Iowa Press.
- Smith, Daryl; Williams, Dave; Houseal, Greg; Henderson, Kirk (2010). The Tallgrass Prairie Center Guide to Prairie Restoration in the Upper Midwest. University of Iowa Press.

== See also ==
- Buffalo Commons
- List of ecoregions in the United States (EPA)
- List of ecoregions in the United States (WWF)
- Range condition scoring
