= Waterfowl production area =

Waterfowl production areas (WPAs) are a small component of the National Wildlife Refuge System. There are over 2 million acres (8,100 km^{2}) of this prime duck-producing land, mostly prairie potholes in the Dakotas, Minnesota, and Montana. The U.S. Fish and Wildlife Service owns, leases, or holds easements on the lands.
