= Great Plains ecoregion =

Ecoregion in North America

The ecology of the Great Plains is diverse, largely owing to their great size. Differences in rainfall, elevation, and latitude create a variety of habitats including short grass, mixed grass, and tall-grass prairies, and riparian ecosystems.

The Great Plains extend from Mexico in the south through the central United States to central Canada. Many sub-regions exist within the area.

The region is home to many animals, including American bison, pronghorn, mule, and white tailed deer, and birds such as ducks, hawks, and sparrows, along with many invertebrate species.

Settlement of "America's breadbasket" led to ecological destruction. Widespread agriculture led to the near-complete extermination of the American bison in the late 1800s and the reduction of the tallgrass prairie to less than 1% of its former extent. The plains are now largely agricultural, with large ranches and farms. However, restoration efforts in some areas, like American Prairie in Montana, are leading to the gradual expansion of the threatened ecosystem.

== Climate ==
The climate is unique due to the many different wind patterns that flow throughout the region, traveling from east to west and north to south. Due to the fact that this region is geographically positioned in the center of the United States and Canada, there are many different air mass types that pass through and affect the constantly shifting weather patterns. This means that the Great Plains has a less consistent climate due to its central location than a region located on the coast. This is shown by how the western Great Plains is semi-arid, while the eastern portion of the Great Plains is much wetter. It has the four seasons of summer, autumn, winter, spring, but each season brings new extremes in the weather conditions. For example, the southern portions of the region typically experience 70 to 100 days each year over 90 °F, while the northern portions typically see only 10 to 20 days above 90 °F. It's the air masses that come in from all directions that bring this variable climate.

Each air mass type brings in different temperature and moisture properties. The continental polar air mass brings in cold and dry air from central Canada, traveling south across the region. The continental tropical air mass comes in from the Gulf of Mexico and the Caribbean, bringing in hot and dry air while moving north. The maritime tropical air mass comes from the southwest United States and Northern Mexico, and it tends to bring in warm and moist air, but sometimes the air that comes in is dry. The last air mass that affects this ecoregion is the maritime polar air mass. It comes in from the Pacific Ocean and moves east over the mountain regions. It brings in cool moist air that changes to warm dry air after moving over the mountains. These air masses cause the seasons to be very extreme and drastic. The winter time brings harsh and varied weather. The midsummer months bring in warm moist and dry air, depending on the area within the region and what air masses affect those areas.

Paralleling the varying climate patterns is the precipitation. The areas nearest the Gulf of Mexico, where the atmospheric moisture is greatest, will receive more than forty inches of precipitation annually. The western areas of the region, such as Montana, receive less than fourteen inches annually. In the winter time, the southern region has less than an inch of snowfall, while the northern regions receive more than forty. The spring time is also a season that brings much precipitation to the Great Plains through the cold, dry air masses that interact with the air masses from the Gulf of Mexico, creating outbreaks of severe thunderstorms with heavy rainfall, high winds, hail, and tornadoes. Most of the winter season in the Northern Plains actually has a snow blanket over a majority of the winter season. This shows how there is consistent precipitation over the region during the winter months, while in the heat of summer there is more chance for drought with sporadic heavy rains.

=== Climate change ===
Due to the highly variable climatic regimes across the Great Plains, many aspects of climate change are not expected to affect all areas of the eco-region equally. In regards to precipitation, this means an exacerbation of extremes where dry areas in the south are expected to get drier and wetter areas in the north to get wetter. In turn this will increase the intensity of already problematic droughts across the region as well as creating the potential for flooding in the wetter north. The percent change in precipitation for both areas is dependent upon different emission scenarios; with higher emission levels in the future being conducive to greater extremes. Dramatic increases in average annual temperature are also expected, with average winter temperatures already having risen 7 °F in the past 30 years. These increased temperatures are expected to cause warmer winters with warmer springs as well as hotter summers in the south-central plains.

In regards to the biotic communities of the Great Plains, the potential repercussions of these changes could be felt in a variety of ways. Extreme droughts could kill vegetation, potentially causing the collapse of agriculture in some areas increasing the risk of erosion. This loss of growing medium, nutrients and moisture retention could prove to be a devastating blow to any ecosystem that may try to reclaim the land as well as leaving the barren areas susceptible to more stress tolerant invasive species. Additionally, droughts could dry up prairie potholes essential for the breeding of many species, especially migratory waterbirds. Changes in temperature have the potential to cause range shifts for some species, possibly increasing competition between species that never previously shared a range and even decreasing populations of or eliminating species that can't effectively spread or adapt to new conditions. Temperature changes, especially earlier springs, could also cause changes in phenology which could put organisms out of sync with their ecosystem and eventually lead to their decline. Other potential issues include a loss of biodiversity and decreased productivity within the ecoregion.

== Geology, topography, and soil ==
Originally massive glaciers that formed in Canada moved southward over the central and low-elevation plains located in the United States. These glaciers and their deposits had great effects on the surface of the land they covered, with biggest changes occurring between the Missouri and Ohio Rivers. One key abiotic factor that affects Great Plains is weather in relation to the low- relief topography as result of glacial smoothing. Low relief topography is used to describe areas that have little difference in altitude throughout the region. Low relief landscapes, such as the various types of grasslands found throughout the Great Plains, have an effect on rainfall distribution. Rainfall in this ecoregion increases from west to east resulting in various types of prairie grasslands.

Topography in the Great Plains actually affects soil composition in areas of different elevation. Higher accumulations of soil organic matter are found in lower landscape positions such as grasslands than in higher landscape positions such as buttes, mesas, and escarpments found throughout the north western areas of the ecoregion. In the short grass regions such as the High Plains of the Great Plains, soil typically stores no moisture annually because vegetation depends on whatever water exists in the soil during dry spells. Soil in this region is typically drained, composed of loam and clay. Specialized plants such as various species of forbs and shrubs utilize this soil. Some adaptations that plants have acquired in this region include massive and intricate root systems that make up around 90 percent of the plants biomass. This allows the plants to stay securely planted in ground and have roots that reach moisture in the deepest sections of the soil. In tall grass prairies, water is less scarce and the soil contains more moisture resulting a smaller root biomass.

== Hydrology ==
The Great Plains ecoregion comprises a number of water bodies which play an integral role in its unique hydrology. There are thirteen rivers that are considered to be located within the Great Plains region. Most of the rivers that originate in the Rocky Mountain region in the west are a source of irrigation for farms. These rivers benefit greatly from melted snow pack from the mountains, which feeds the rivers during the growing season. Another water source in the Great Plains is wetlands, with the greatest concentrations located in the northern glaciated region of the plains. Up to half of areas in the northern Great Plains are wetlands. These, as well as the wetlands in the Nebraska Sandhills, serve as major breeding, staging, and nesting habitat for migratory waterfowl. Playas, or temporary lakes, in the southwestern United States also provide habitats for migrating waterfowl from Canada and the United States during the winter.

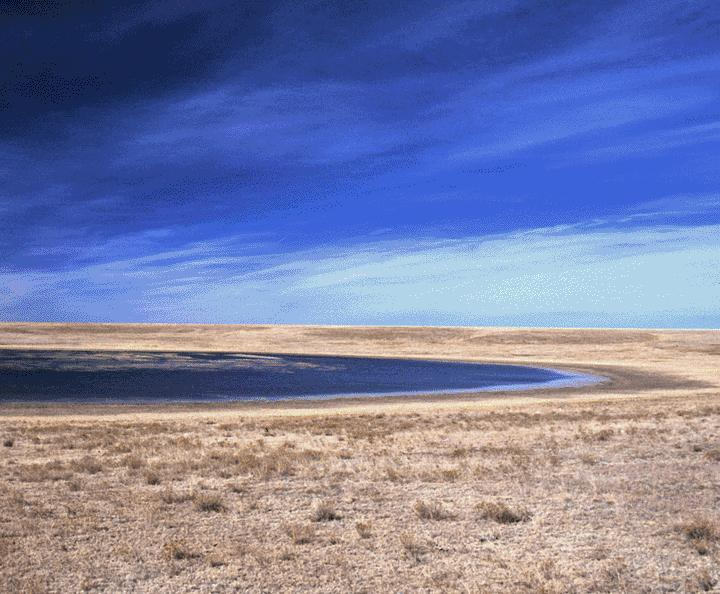
A playa lake during the wet season. Playa lakes are important breeding grounds for migratory waterfowl.

The Ogallala aquifer, or the High Plains aquifer, is an integral fresh water source for the entirety of the Great Plains region, providing drinking water to 80% of the population and irrigating 13 million acres of land. Precipitation, seasonal lakes, and prehistoric water reserves serve as sources of water for the aquifer, which lies beneath 174,000 square miles of the Central and Southern regions, contains 3.25 billion acre-feet of water, and which is used by around 200,000 irrigation wells. Around 95% of the water pumped out of the aquifer is used for irrigation for the extensive areas of farmland in the Great Plains. The playa lakes, or seasonal lakes, are the primary sources of recharge for the aquifer, with an average of 0.5 inches per year as the recharge rate for the entire High Plains region. Population, agricultural, and economic growth have increased the demand for water in the areas that rely on the aquifer, causing the average level of water in the aquifer to drop by 13 feet since 1950.

== Environmental threats ==
The environmental threats that pose the most harm toward the Great Plains include water depletion, land degradation, and increasing temperature change. The winter months have become much warmer in the Plains, whether it is in the North, near North Dakota, or in the South, throughout Texas and bordering states, excluding the winters of 2014, 2015, and 2016. Though the winters are getting warmer, it is predicted that the summer months will have a greater increase than the temperatures in the winter months. The effects of this increase in temperature is predicted to cause more frequent extreme events such as heat waves, droughts, and heavy rainfall. This great increase in temperature will be the cause of the increased depletion of already declining water sources. Depleting water in the Great Plains will affect all populations in a negative way. "Most of the water used in the Great Plains comes from the High Plains aquifer (sometimes referred to by the name of its largest formation, the Ogallala aquifer), which stretches from South Dakota to Texas."

Conserving water in the Great Plains is one of the most important factors in keeping the Great Plains sustainable. It is also very important that farmers who use the land are sustainable in their practices. Since there are many different sustainable ways of farming, it is hard to decide which way would be the most sustainable. However, according to the Annals of the Association of American Geographers, farmers are not very likely to change their ways, leaving the outcome questionable for the Great Plains. "What is really needed are new methods, concepts, and measuring techniques".

The biggest challenge in changing the sustainability in such a large ecoregion is getting the a large portion of farmers using the land to practice in a way that does not harm the land, which poses to be a challenge since there are so many different farming practices. "Prairie conservation requires: 1) New technology...to prioritize and set context to save prairie, 2) ecologically based initiatives to reverse significant losses in area and condition of native grasslands, 3) rethinking of standardized tools in the range management profession, and 4) a new natural resource agency."

== Habitats ==
There are many different types of habitats in the Great Plains, because of its great size. Differences in latitude and longitude, as well as differences in elevation and proximity to water, shape the ecosystems of these grasslands.

=== Tallgrass prairies ===
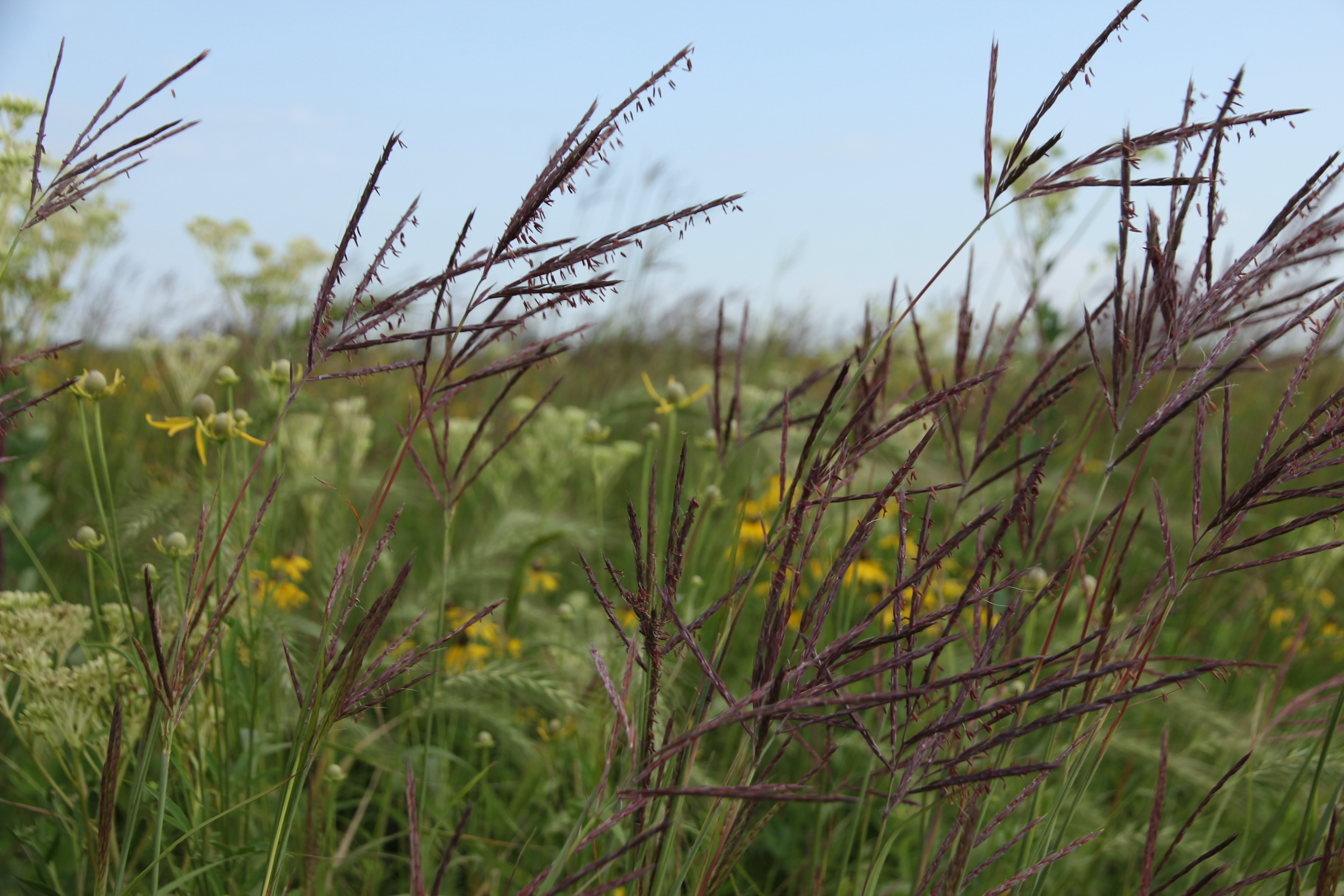
Flowering big bluestem, a characteristic tallgrass prairie plant

Tallgrass prairies are found in the southern and eastern section of the great plains. It once covered 170 million acres in North America. Now, less than 4% remains, mostly in the Kansas Flint Hills. This area is lower and wetter than the High Plains and is warmer than many other regions. Some areas here receive more than 40 inches of annual precipitation. Grasses here include bluestems, along with many other species. Historically, many areas of the Midwest that are now forested were once tallgrass prairie. Fire is very important in maintaining the prairie. Without it, many areas can become forested.

=== Short-grass prairies ===
Short-grass prairies are found in the high plains of Colorado, Kansas, Montana, Nebraska, New Mexico, North Dakota, Oklahoma, South Dakota, Texas, and Wyoming. 70% of the original short-grass prairie remains today, making it one of the least fragmented prairie ecosystems.

== Characteristic flora ==
Grasslands occur where there is insufficient rain to support trees, thus only grasses and a few shrubs can survive. There are three kinds of grasslands on the great plains, short grass prairie, mixed grass, and long grass prairie. In each of these, grass species serve all the keystone roles. They provide food, shelter, act as larval hosts for numerous species and acted as the primary food for buffalo. These grasses are of vital importance to the ecosystem and protect the soil from the strong winds that whip through the prairie. They are all drought resistant and have strong short roots that hold the soil in place.

In short grass prairie there are two dominant plants, buffalo grass (Bouteloua dactyloides), is a strong and hardy grass that is the favorite of grazers. The second is blue grama (Bouteloua gracilis), which is essential for soil retention. In tallgrass prairie there are four dominant species, big bluestem grass (Andropogen gerardii), Indian grass (Sorghastrum nutans), switch grass (Panicum virgatum), and little bluestem (Schizachyrium scoparium). Big bluestem grass is 4–8 feet tall and was the favorite food of the buffalo.

== Characteristic fauna ==
A "keystone species" is a species that "has disproportionate importance in their community." Keystone species on the great plains include the bison and the prairie dog. Many other species live on the grasslands, including deer, rabbits, mice, and many types of birds.

=== Prairie dogs ===
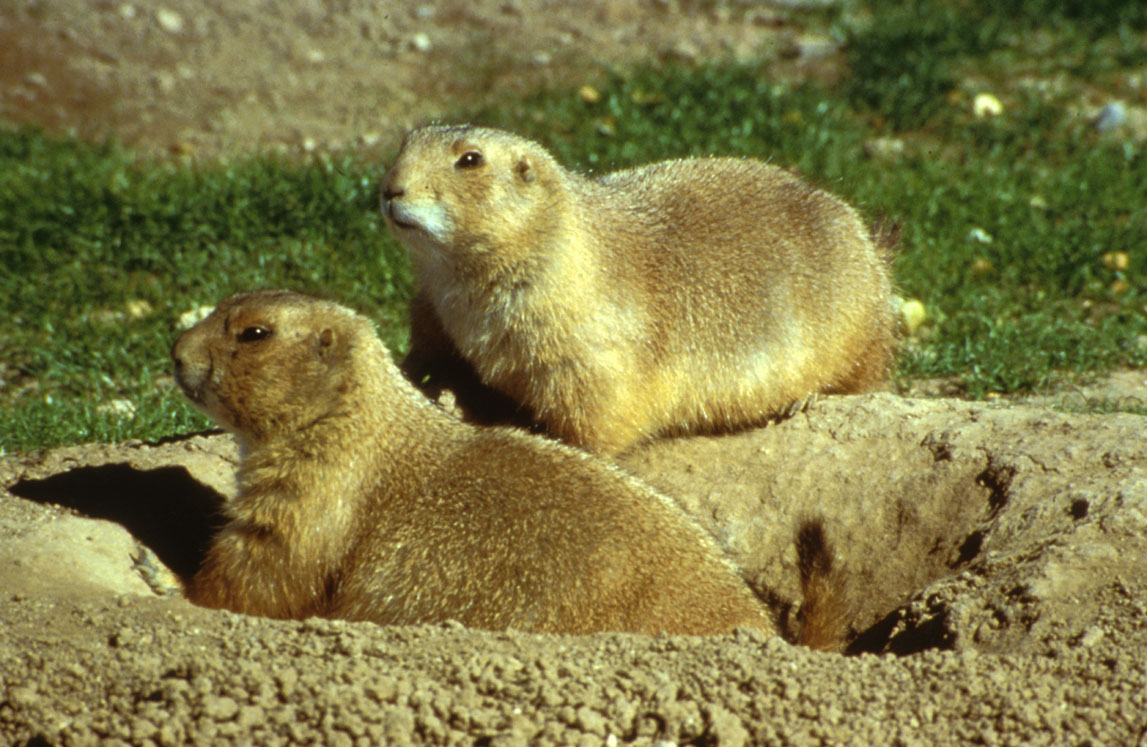
Two black-tailed prairie dogs

In the Great Plains, the prairie dog is a keystone species. Studies comparing species abundances in areas of colonization against areas with no prairie dog colonization show clear evidence that the prairie dog does have a significant impact on its surroundings by altering vegetation and therefore affecting habitat and food availability for other species. There is a great mosaic of vegetative diversity within the Great Plains due to the prairie dog's extensive grazing on long grasses. This mosaic supports a variety of small mammals. In addition to altering vegetation, the prairie dog also creates habitat for many other organisms by creating extensive tunnel systems that other small mammals such as the desert cottontail, striped skunk and deer mouse use for shelter. A strong characteristic of keystone species is their ability to create and modify other organisms' habitats and it is evident that the prairie dog does this.

There are several types of prairie dogs in the ecoregion, including black-tailed, white-tailed, and Gunnison's, though the black-tailed is the most abundant and widespread.

=== Bison ===
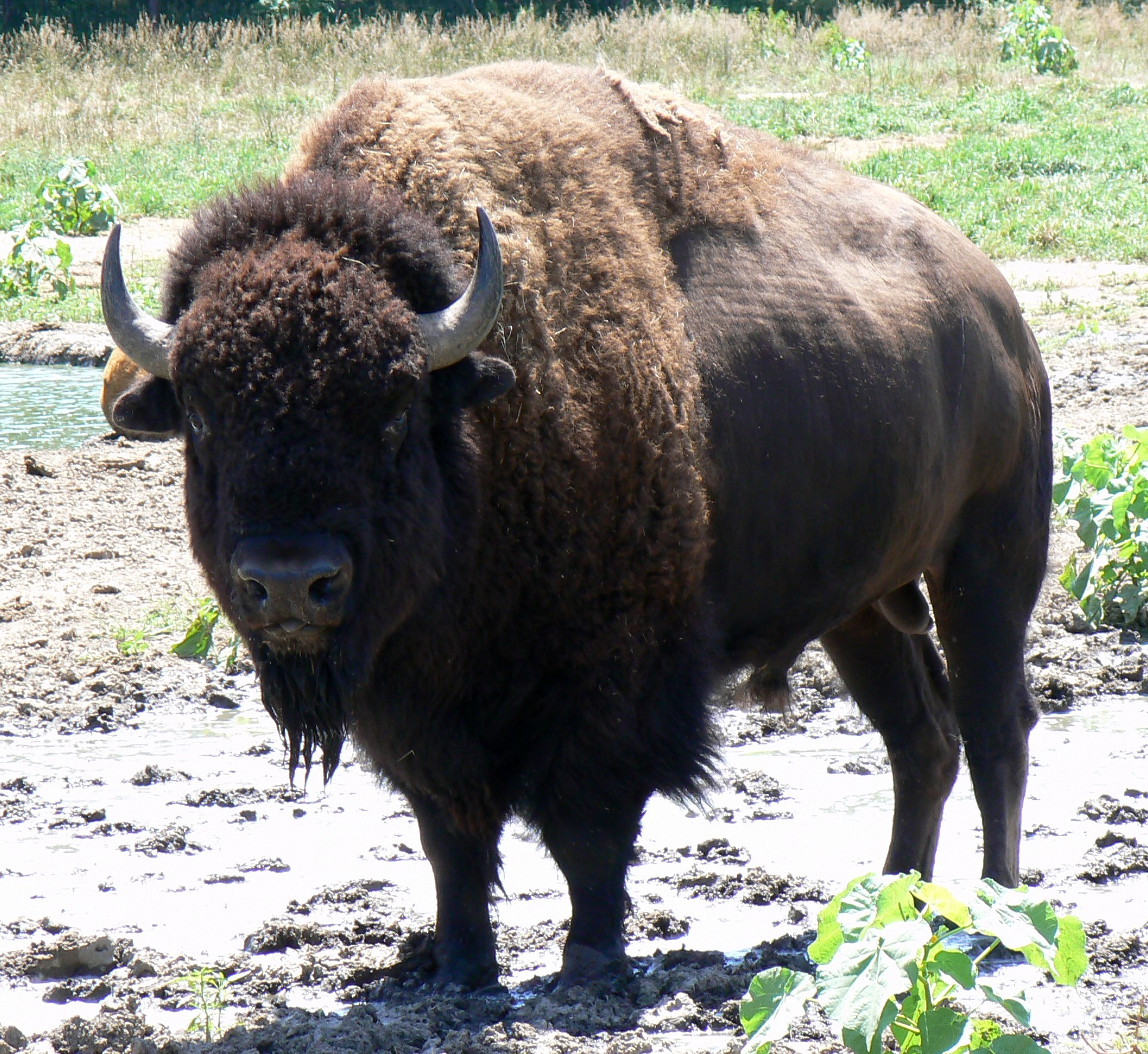
An American bison. (Bison bison)

The American bison (Bison bison) once roamed the Great Plains grasslands in vast herds. Their total population numbers were once in the tens of millions and spanned most of North America. The dwindling numbers severely reduced their ecological impact. The bison's large influence as a grazer, a major converter of plant to animal biomass, and a key link in nutrient recycling have been lost. Their grazing habits were pivotal in allowing for the establishment of much of the biodiversity observed today in the region, including the prairie dog.

Along with fire, bison were responsible for the removal of excess plant material that accumulated in the grassland. With the accumulation of dead plant material, seed germination is greatly hindered and biodiversity is held stagnant. The purging of excess biomass helped to promote and maintain biodiversity among plant species on the plains.

While the American bison once played a keystone role in both the establishment and maintenance of the Great Plain's current biodiversity, the severely reduced population that still remains has little ecological effect on the Great Plains ecoregion.

== Endangered species ==
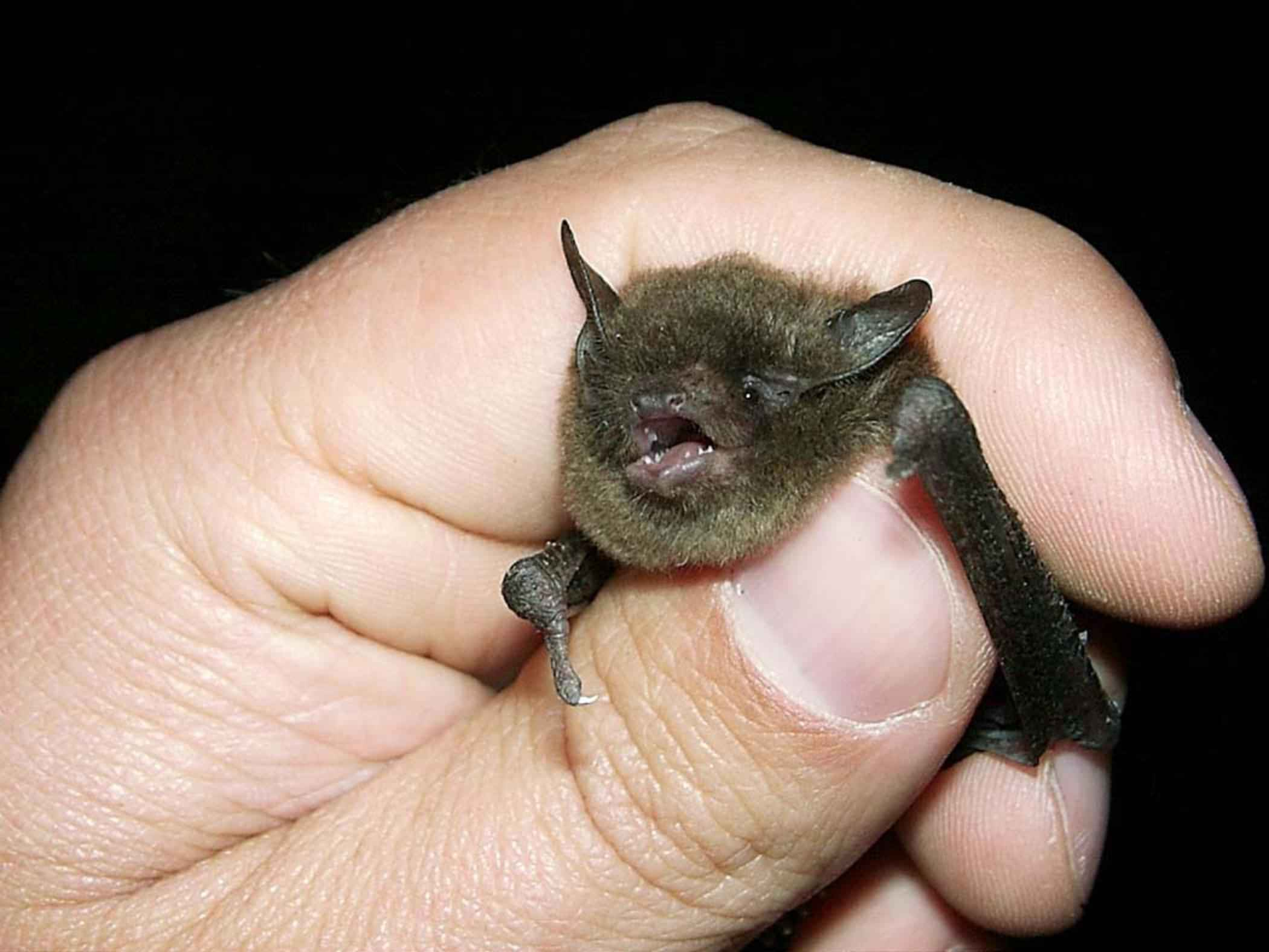
An Indiana bat (Myotis sodalis)

The Indiana bat is an important predator within the Great Plains. The Indiana bat perpetuates biodiversity by consuming moths, mosquitoes, and flies under the night sky. This bat sleeps in abandoned caves and mines during the winter months for hibernation and under tree bark during the warmer seasons. This Indiana bat is endangered mainly due to human disturbance within the caves. However, help is underway to protect this species. Besides showing hospitality to these bats, gates are going up to prohibit visitors from entering the caves and mines during the hibernation months. Studies are also ensuing to try and discover other factors diminishing the Indiana bat's population.

Another dwindling species of the Great Plains is the Small White Lady's Slipper. There are only 100 of these orchids left. Invasive species and land conservationists have equally played a part in demolishing this population; as well as people plucking these flowers. The only working conservation action to salvage the Small White Lady's Slippers requires controlled fires; eliminating surrounding invasive plants and providing the Small White Lady's Slippers with enough surface area and nutrients to repopulate. This plant needs to grow next to a fungus in order to survive because of the symbiotic relationship between them.

== See also ==
- Flora of the Great Plains (North America)
  - Flora of the Canadian Prairies subregion
- Grasslands of the North American Great Plains
- Great Plains—related topics
- Temperate grasslands, savannas, and shrublands in the United States — biome's ecoregions and habitats in the U.S.
