= Shortgrass prairie =

Ecosystem located on the North American Great Plains

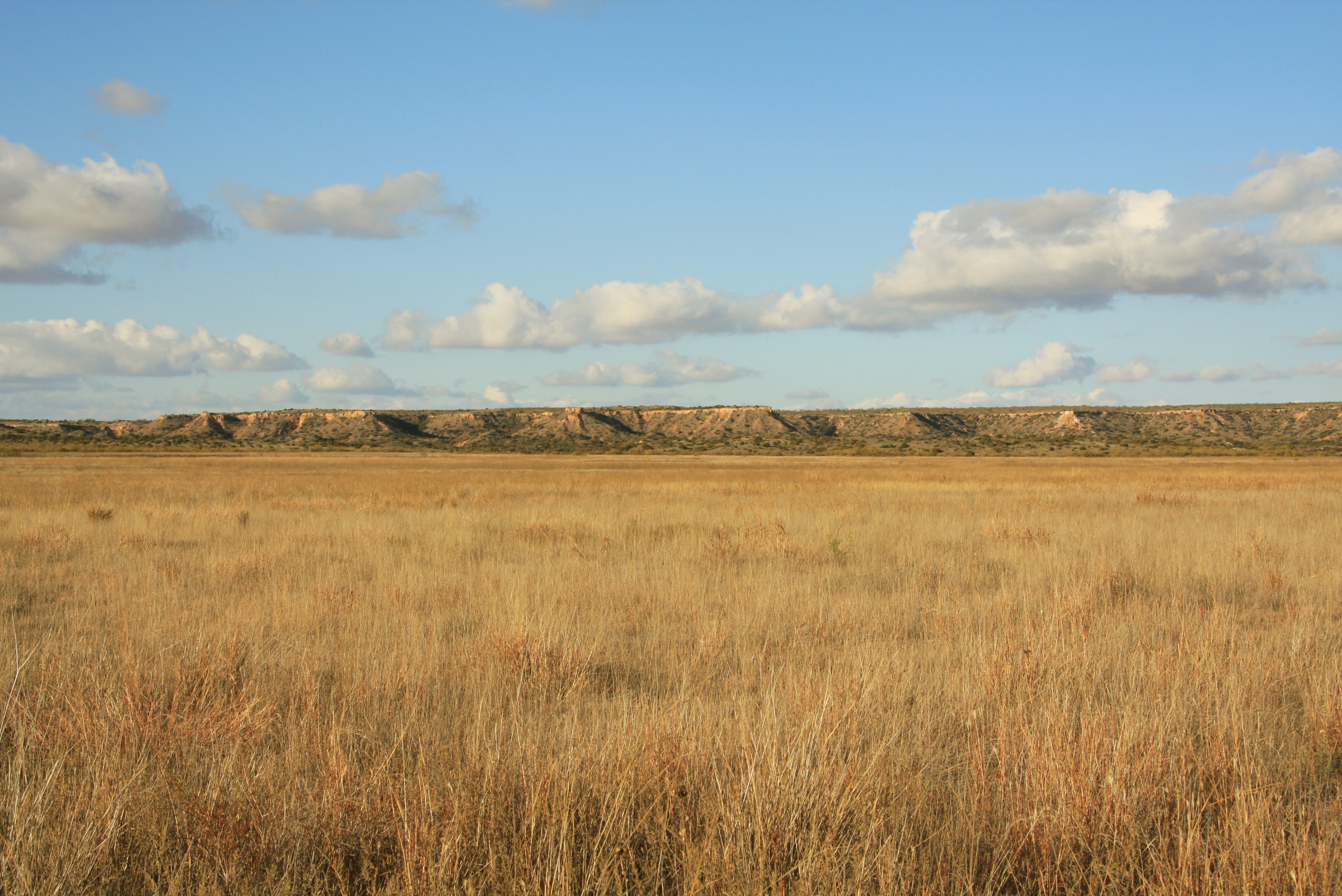
Shortgrass prairie of the Llano Estacado

Shortgrass prairie in relation to the Great Plains of the United States Shortgrass prairie Mixed grass prairie Tallgrass prairie

The shortgrass prairie is an ecosystem located in the Great Plains of North America. The two most dominant grasses in the shortgrass prairie are blue grama (Bouteloua gracilis) and buffalograss (Bouteloua dactyloides), the two less dominant grasses in the prairie are greasegrass (Tridens flavus) and sideoats grama (Bouteloua curtipendula). The prairie was formerly maintained by grazing pressure of American bison, which is the keystone species. Due to its semiarid climate, the shortgrass prairie receives on average less precipitation than that of the tall and mixed grass prairies to the east.

Lying largely in the rain shadow of the mountains to the west, the prairie includes lands in the eastern foothills of the Rocky Mountains and extends east as far as Nebraska and north into Saskatchewan. The prairie stretches through parts of Alberta, Wyoming, Montana, North Dakota, South Dakota, and Kansas, and passes south through the high plains of Colorado, Oklahoma, Texas, and New Mexico.

== History ==
The shortgrass prairie has a long human history. The Kiowa, Comanche, and Arapaho peoples occupied the land and hunted bison and pronghorn. Seasonally, these tribes would stage hunts in the adjacent mountains such as the Rocky Mountains. To manage the prairie, those tribes and their predecessors likely used fire. They would create fuel breaks, a gap in vegetation or other combustible material that acts as a barrier to slow or stop the progress of a brushfire or wildfire. A firebreak may occur naturally in areas without vegetation or other fuel, such as a river, lake or canyon around their settlements. These fuel breaks would also entice large herbivores to patches of fresh new growth.

European explorers, trappers, and fur traders began to settle the shortgrass prairie. They developed an extractive economy that led to the later growth and industrialization of the prairie. In the mid-to-late 19th century, the railroads expanded transportation channels and helped to increase settlement, predominantly in rural and small towns. While more people began to settle in the prairie, large-scale cattle and sheep ranching increased as well and later led to the development of gold, silver, and copper mining communities.

=== Dust Bowl ===
In the 1920s, El Niño played a big role in the success of crop growing in the shortgrass prairie by causing more precipitation throughout the prairie and promoting plant growth. The success encouraged farmers to buy more efficient farming equipment. With the new equipment, farmers turned up the native land, exposing the soil. By the time the 1930s came around, it was too late to protect the soil with grass. The unprotected soil contributed to the Dust Bowl by being blown around and creating dust storms.

=== Acts ===
==== Food Security Act of 1985 ====
The Food Security Act of 1985 allowed for lower commodity prices and income supports. This Act also laid the foundation for the dairy herd buyout program. The Act made changes to several other USDA programs.

==== Conservation Reserve Program ====
Farmers enrolled in the program agree to abolish environmentally destroyed land from agricultural production and cattle grazing to improve and regrow healthy grass and habitats in exchange for a yearly rental payment.

=== Today ===
Much of the shortgrass prairie is grazed by domestic livestock, with a human population that is dependent upon agriculture. However, energy and mining exploration have increased. There has been a precipitous decline of many species, but farmers and ranchers of the region are demonstrating that sound land management practices can help sustain the native species, natural communities, and ecosystems.

== Climate ==
The shortgrass prairie is a long thin stretch of territory that starts at the top of the country and makes its way to the bottom. Due to this, the climate varies from North to South, but is essentially the same from East to West. The temperature in the North is significantly colder on average then the temperature in the South. Also, there is more precipitation to the south, and more precipitation to the East. The shortgrass prairie has a one to two month summer drought unlike the tall and mixed grass prairies. It also the driest of the three prairie types. This region has hailstorms, blizzards, tornadoes, and dust storms.

== Ecosystem ==
The shortgrass prairie was once filled with huge herds of free-ranging bison and pronghorn. The prairie also teemed with large prairie dog colonies, deer and elk, and predators such as gray wolves and grizzly bears. The prairie is home to healthy populations of plains blue grama, a vast array of songbirds and raptors, carpets of buffalo grass and a broad diversity and abundance of wildflowers and butterflies. It was a landscape so teeming with life it has been compared to the South American Pampas. Today the most populous animal on the prairie is domestic cattle. Pronghorn and prairie dogs still inhabit the prairie however, in fewer numbers. Top predators have been replaced by coyotes.

Ecological processes on a large-scale level such as climate, fire and grazing have strong influences in this system. Today, the shortgrass prairie has suffered the greatest biological destruction of any major biome in North America. The three central processes historically shaping the shortgrass prairie are herbivory, drought, and fire. Habitat destruction, extermination of native herbivores and predators, proliferation of noxious weeds, and altered fire regimes have negatively impacted it.

== Flora ==
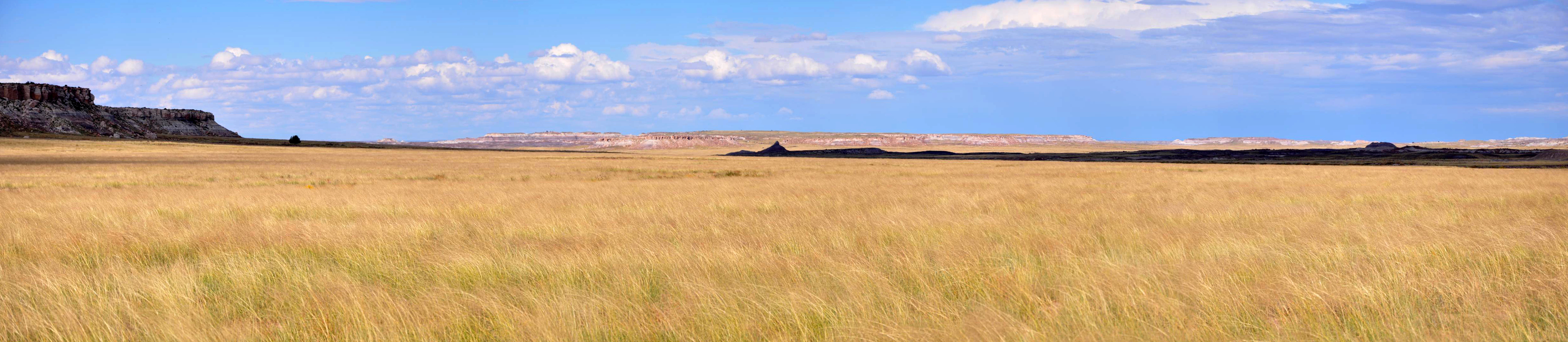
Shortgrass prairie

The shortgrass prairie consists of different varieties of vegetation. Notably abundant grasses are blue grama (Bouteloua gracilis), sod-forming grass, and buffalo grass (Bouteloua dactyloides). Less prevalent is galleta grass (Hilaria). These grasses are native to the shortgrass prairie and therefore are drought and grazing resistant. Not many plant varieties appear in the shortgrass prairie because of its extreme changes in annual precipitation and temperature from one year to the next. Two of the main plants that are able to thrive are soap weed yucca (Yucca glauca) and plains prickly pear (Opuntia). In the years of greater precipitation, otherwise dormant wildflowers bloom in the spring, quickly diminishing in the hotter and drier summer months.

== Fauna ==
The shortgrass prairie consists of many kinds of birds, reptiles, and mammals. Most of those animals have adapted to living in such an open area, and many have adapted to living under ground or traveling long distances to find shelter.

=== Birds ===
Grassland birds, particularly those of the shortgrass prairie, are one North America's fastest declining groups of animals. Some of birds still inhabiting the shortgrass prairie are the Cassin's sparrow, loggerhead shrike, sandhill crane, scaled quail, Swainson's hawk, burrowing owl, mountain plover and thick-billed longspur. Although the loggerhead shrike and scaled quail are among the more common birds to see in the shortgrass prairie, they are also on the steepest decline.

=== Reptiles ===
Roundtail horned lizard, Texas garter snake, Texas horned lizard, Texas long-nosed snake and Western Massasauga are among the most dominant reptiles in the shortgrass prairie. Most of those animals are cold-blooded and so in the winter months, they live underground until spring comes.

=== Mammals ===
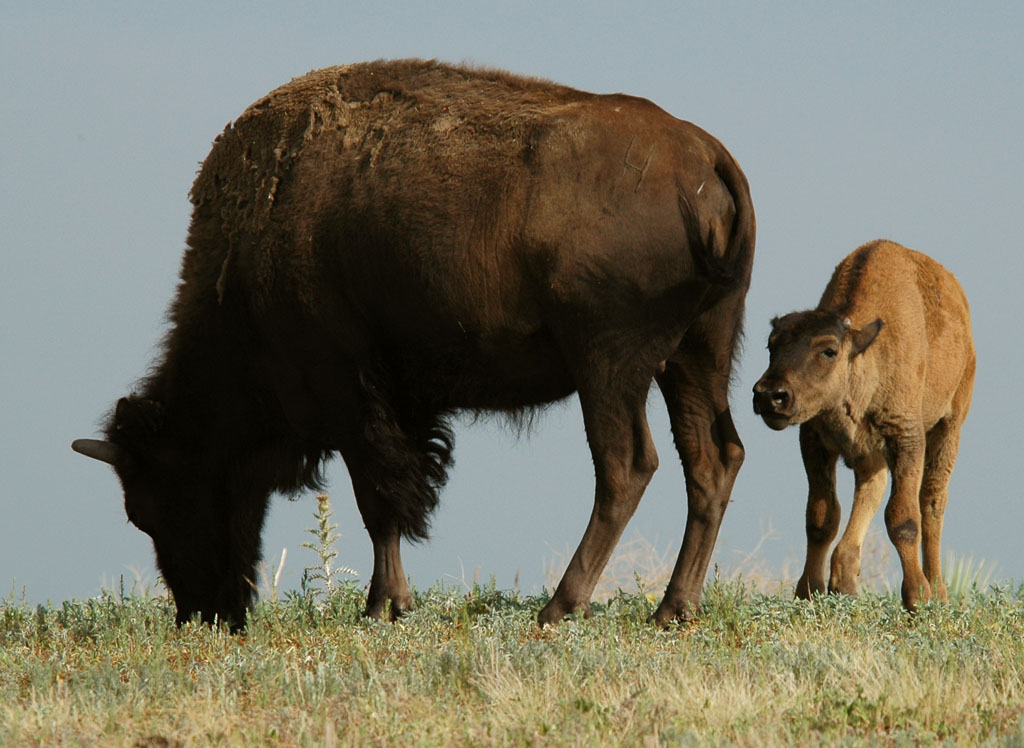
A bison mother and calf grazing on the prairie.

Today, cattle, pronghorn and white-tailed deer are the most abundant mammals on the shortgrass prairie. Domestic cattle were placed in the prairie and have essentially replaced the native species that used to live in the shortgrass prairie such as bison and elk. In addition, the top predators used to be the Great Plains wolf and the grizzly bear, but the coyote has replaced those animals.

Prairie dogs were once the most abundant animals in the shortgrass prairie and historically, numbers in North America were estimated to be around 5 billion by the year 1800. However, a wide range of both anthropogenic and natural factors, like habitat loss, and disease like sylvatic plague have massively reduced numbers, reducing their range across several American states like Utah by up to 90%. The decrease has also been driven by poisoning campaigns, habitat disruption, and hunting. The decline in prairie dogs has significantly impacted many of the other animals that reside in the shortgrass prairie, including the black-footed ferret, whose diet relies on prairie dogs. Other animals negatively affected by the decline of prairie dogs are the mountain plover, swift fox, ferruginous hawk and the burrowing owl.

== Conservation ==
In Colorado, which contains a substantial portion of the shortgrass prairie biome, no legal ecosystem protection exists. More than 85% of prairie is privately owned and used for agriculture, particularly for dry land wheat, irrigated corn, soybeans and alfalfa. Roughly half of the original prairie extent is still present, however conservation in the long run is uncertain. Urban expansion is likely to continue having a negative impact. Climate change has less of an effect here than in other areas of Colorado due to the lower elevation, but can still be expected to affect the biome.

=== Prairie Dog Coalition ===
The Prairie Dog Coalition is a non-profit group of scientists, organizations and citizens who are fighting for the protection of prairie dogs and their environments. The alliance educates people on the declining populations of prairie dogs and engages with projects likely to destroy prairie dog habitat.

=== Southern Plains Land Trust ===
The Southern Plains Land Trust (SPLT) creates and protects a network of shortgrass prairie preserves to ensure the future of all native animals and plants in the region. As of 2019, over 25,000 acres are included in SPLT's preserve network.

=== American Prairie Foundation ===
The American Prairie Foundation is a nonprofit organization in Montana that seeks to build a nature reserve called the American Prairie through land acquisition and public land integration.

== Population ==
There are two significant population trends currently impacting the shortgrass prairie region. Firstly, the population of rural areas in the region is decreasing, with many of those people moving westward. Additionally, more people are moving to metropolitan areas, with about three quarters of the population in this region residing in those metropolitan areas. The growth of these urban areas may negatively affect their local ecosystems due to the potential introduction of invasive species, decreasing the biodiversity in impacted areas. The human population today is still mainly dependent on agriculture, but fields such as energy exploration and mining are expanding.

== Economy ==
=== Crop production ===
Large portions of central grasslands in the United States are used for intensive agriculture. It is estimated that about 50 percent of the shortgrass prairie is still uncultivated. The shortgrass prairie produces high crop-yields, and in this specific prairie wheat is the major crop grown. Other major crops grown are maize, soybeans, and cotton.

=== Livestock production ===
The dry grasslands of the shortgrass prairie yield for extensive grazing operations. Typically cow-calf operations with the young animal sold for finishing in feedlots. Stocking rates and the economy in this region highly depend on the amount of precipitation, range conditions, and other environmental factors.

=== Art ===
Parts of the shortgrass prairie are untouched and pastoral. Many artists and photographers travel to this prairie for inspiration and economic opportunities. Paintings and photographs are often sold at high prices for their aesthetic beauty. The Dust Bowl brought a lot of artists and photographers to this area in seek of fame and economic opportunities.

== Boundaries ==
The shortgrass prairie is located on the western side of the Great Plains with the Colorado Rockies to its West and the mixed grass prairie to its East. The prairie extends to the eastern part of the Rocky Mountains to the West, up to Canada to the North, as far as Nebraska to the East, and as far as parts of Texas to the South.

== See also ==
- Buffalo Lake National Wildlife Refuge
- Buffalo commons
- Canadian Prairies
- Grassland
- Great Plains
- High Plains
- Llano Estacado
- Semi-arid climate
- Tallgrass prairie
- Steppe
- Temperate grasslands, savannas, and shrublands
- Great American Desert
