= Dag Hammarskjöld Foundation =

Swedish non-profit foundation

- Stiftelsen Dag Hammarskjölds Minnesfond

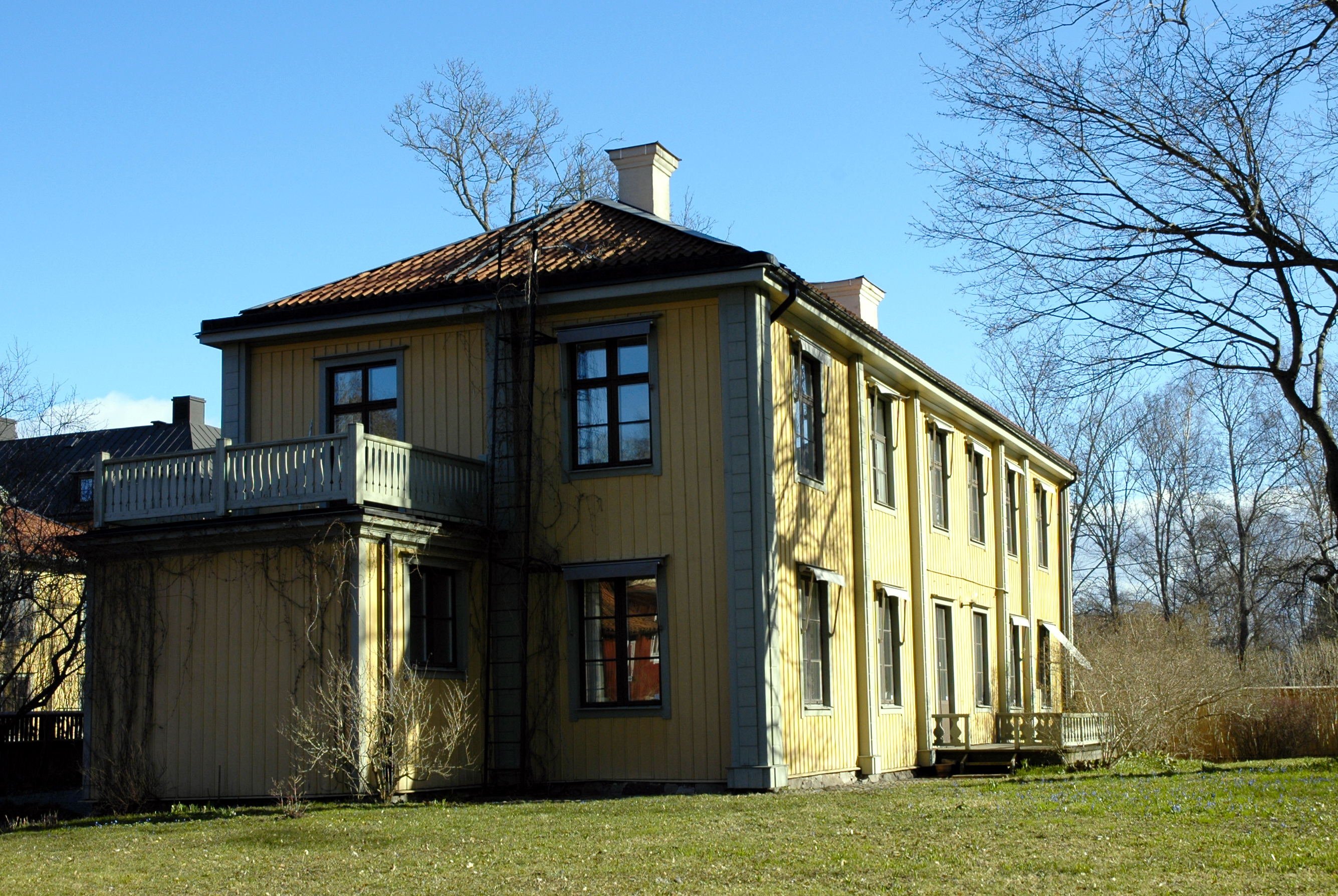
- The Dag Hammarskjöld Centre houses the Foundation's secretariat
- Named after: Dag Hammarskjöld
- Formation: 2 March 1962; 64 years ago
- Type: Non-governmental
- Legal status: Foundation
- Purpose: To organize seminars in developing countries on socio-political and economic topics
- Locations: Uppsala, Sweden; New York, United States
- Region served: Worldwide
- Methods: Seminars, policy papers and reports
- Fields: Socio-political, economic, cultural and environmental issues
- Website: www.daghammarskjold.se

The Dag Hammarskjöld Foundation, (Swedish: Stiftelsen Dag Hammarskjölds Minnesfond) is an autonomous, non-governmental, non-profit foundation established in 1962 in memory of Dag Hammarskjöld, the second Secretary-General of the United Nations.

The Foundation is a based in Uppsala, Sweden, and aims to strengthen policy on international cooperation, development and peacebuilding.

== History ==
The foundation was created in 1962 as Sweden's national memorial to Dag Hammarskjöld, Secretary General of the United Nations from 1953 until his death in a plane crash on a mission to the Congo.

== Focus areas ==
- UN development system renewal
- Building peace
- Support for the implementation Security Council resolution 2282, as well as General Assembly resolution 70/262
- Promote inclusivity in peacebuilding
1. Promote mediation and dialogue in peacebuilding

=== International development agenda (Agenda 2030) ===
The Sustainable Development Goals and Agenda 2030 were both launched in 2015. Since then the foundation has attempted to follow the development and the implementation of the Agenda. It has done this by creating a seminar series, as well as via the creation of a Goal Tracker.

The seminar series is run in cooperation with UNDP Sweden and aims to raise public awareness of the Sustainable Development Goals, as well as to stimulate debate about the challenges and opportunities of the Agenda.

The Goal Tracker was launched in autumn of 2017 in cooperation with Data Act Lab (DAL) and aims to create a digital platform that can monitored to the needs and preconditions of participating countries in regards to their implementation of Agenda 2030.

=== Global governance ===
This program was launched in order to stimulate new ways of thinking about global challenges, and how to gather local responses in response to global challenges

The Dag Hammarskjöld Foundation and Uppsala University have jointly instituted an annual Dag Hammarskjöld Lecture. The first Lecture was held in mid-September 1998. The privilege of delivering the Lecture will be offered to a person who has promoted in action and spirit the values that inspired Dag Hammarskjöld as Secretary-General of the United Nations and generally in his life – composition, humanism, and commitment to international solidarity and cooperation.

The lecture is given in recognition of the values that inspired Dag Hammarskjöld personally and as Secretary-General – compassion, humanism and commitment to international solidarity and cooperation. Previous Dag Hammarskjöld lecturers include UNSG Kofi Annan, Mary Robinson, Sir Brian Urquhart, Jan Eliasson, Tarja Halonen, Margot Wallström, Helen Clark, José Ramos-Horta, UNSG Ban Ki-moon, UNSG António Guterres, Kristiana Figueres and Agnès Callamard. The 2023 Dag Hammarskjöld Lecture was presented by the Deputy UN Secretary General Dr Amina J. Mohammed.

== Board of trustees and the Secretariat ==
- Ruth Jacoby, chair of the board, former Ambassador and diplomat at the Swedish Ministry for Foreign Affairs
- Paula Caballero, Regional Managing Director for Latin America of The Nature Conservancy's (TNC)
- Astrid Thors, Lawyer and politician
- Cecilia Malmström, former Swedish politician
- Ann-Sofie Nilsson, Ambassador and diplomat at the Swedish Ministry for Foreign Affairs
- Erik Hammarskjöld, former Swedish diplomat at the Swedish Ministry for Foreign Affairs
- Joakim Kreuz, Associate Professor at the Department of Government, Uppsala University
