= Sean Garrity =

Sean Garrity may refer to:

- Sean Garrity (director), a Canadian film director and screenwriter.
- Sean Garrity member of band Full Circle
- Sean Garrity, a character in the television series Rescue Me
- Sean Gerrity, founder of American Prairie (nature reserve), a nature reserve in Montana
