= American Prairie (nature reserve) =

Nature reserve in Montana, United States

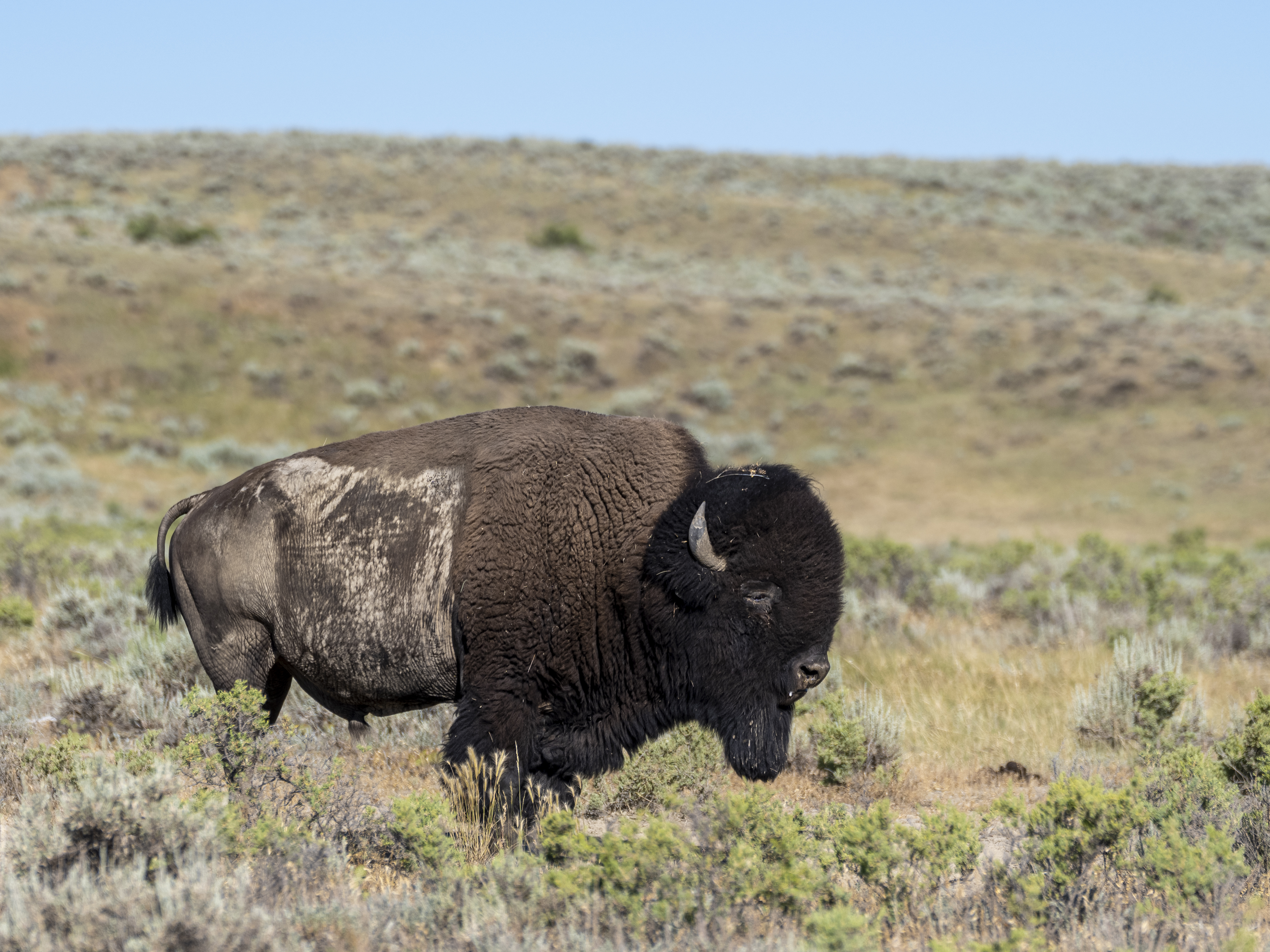
- Interactive map of American Prairie
- Location: Northeast Montana
- Nearest city: Malta
- Coordinates: 47°44′41″N 107°46′33″W
- Area: 603,657 acres (2,442.91 km^{2})
- Established: 2001; 25 years ago
- Operator: American Prairie Foundation

American Prairie (formerly known as American Prairie Reserve or APR) is a prairie-based nature reserve in Central Montana, United States, on a shortgrass prairie ecosystem with migration corridors and native wildlife. This wildlife conservation area is being developed as a private project of the American Prairie Foundation (APF), a non-profit organization. As of 2025, the reserve habitat base covers a total 603,657 acres (244,291 ha). This includes 167,070 deeded acres (67,610 ha) and 436,587 leased acres (176,680 ha) of public land. The organization hopes to expand it greatly through a combination of both private and public lands.

The foundation allows public access to the land for outdoor recreation activities such as hiking, mountain biking, hunting, and fishing. The predominant economic activity in the region is the raising of cattle on homestead parcels along with adjacent rangeland leased from the federal government. Ranchers in the region are invited to adhere to wildlife-friendly standards on their ranches and required to follow specific rules when grazing their cattle on American Prairie's parcels. Within large but securely fenced areas, American Prairie is developing a bison herd with attention to heritage genetics and minimal cattle introgression. Wildlife-friendly fencing allows the natural movement of wildlife such as pronghorn. Animals like prairie dogs are welcome amidst the native vegetation.

== Ecology ==
Prairies are the dominant ecosystem of the Interior Plains of central North America. The main vegetation type of this temperate grassland is herbaceous plants like grasses, sedges, and other prairie plants, rather than woody vegetation like trees. Grazing is important to soil, vegetation and overall ecological balance. The ecosystem was maintained by a pattern of disturbance caused by natural wildfire and grazing by bison, a pattern which is called pyric herbivory.

Before the 1800s, bison were a keystone species for the native shortgrass prairie habitat as their grazing pressure altered the food web and landscapes in ways that improve biodiversity. The expanses of grass sustained migrations of an estimated 30 to 60 million American bison which could be found across much of North America. While they ranged from the eastern seaboard states to southeast Washington, eastern Oregon, and northeastern California, the greatest numbers were found within the great bison belt on the shortgrass plains east of the Rocky Mountains that stretched from Alberta to Texas.

The grasslands once included more than 1,500 species of plants, 350 birds, 220 butterflies, and 90 mammals. The bison coexisted with elk, deer, pronghorn, swift fox, black-footed ferrets, black-tailed prairie dogs, white-tailed jackrabbits, bears, wolves, coyotes, and cougars. The bison scoring the trees with their horns kept them from taking over the open grasslands. As bison grazed, they dispersed seeds by excreting them or depositing them from their fur as they wallow. The heterogeneous or varied landscape created by the roaming bison helps birds and millions still arrive each year. Long-billed curlews are a migratory shorebirds that rely on three types of habitats on the prairie – areas with short grass, long grass and mud – for completing their breeding cycle each year. Mountain plovers use bison wallows as nesting sites. Prairie dogs benefited from the tendency of the bison to graze areas around prairie dog towns. The bison enjoyed the regrowth of plants previously cropped by the rodents which reduced the grass cover, making it easier to spot predators. Bald eagles, ravens, black-billed magpies, swift foxes, golden eagles, grizzly bears, wolves, beetles, and nematodes benefited from bison carcasses.

== Context ==
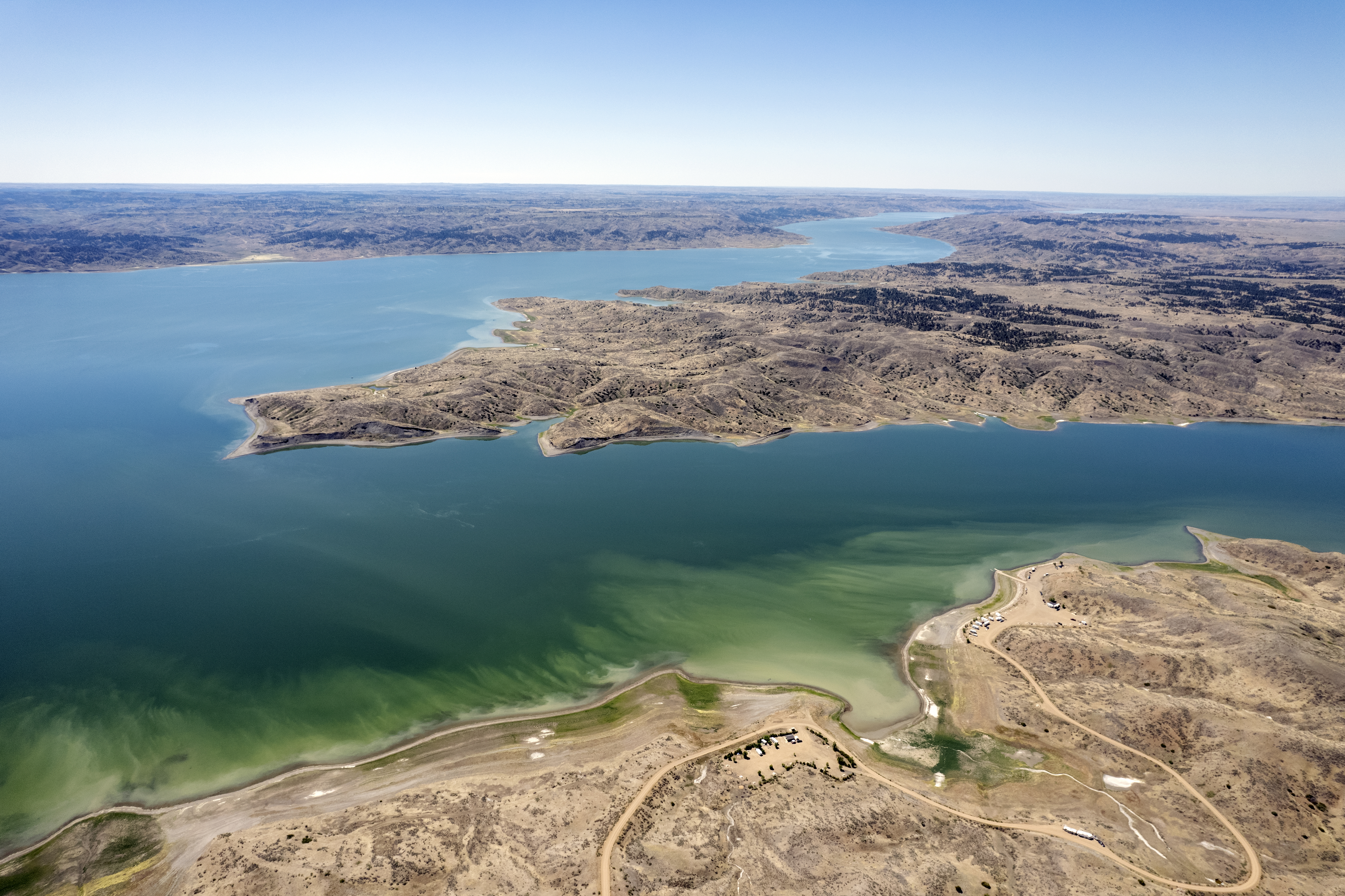
Fort Peck Lake reservoir, near American Prairie, 2021

These are the traditional lands of the indigenous peoples of the Great Plains who hunted bison and pronghorn. The expansion of the United States with the Louisiana Purchase of 1803 doubled the country's territory. This area was commonly known as the Great American Desert and was considered dry, inhospitable and hostile. The fur trade in Montana came to the upper Missouri River from about 1800 to the 1850s. From the 1830s, the population of the indigenous people and the bison were quickly decimated through the actions of the government and those who came to the frontier. Under the 1862 Homestead Act, the U.S. government issued the expropriated land for free to settlers under on the condition that they build homes and run farms or ranches.

Prairies were considered areas to be settled and farmed with millions of acres of prairie land being put to the plow during the era of westward expansion. Extensive unplowed grasslands remained in this portion of northeastern Montana as the soil and climate were not suitable for farming. While the homesteaded parcels were generally insufficient to support a family, the grazing of cattle that extended onto adjacent rangeland owned by the federal government was viable. The Taylor Grazing Act of 1934 set up grazing districts for the management and regulation of rangelands. Invasive crested wheatgrass was introduced by the US government in the 1930s for use as forage for grazing cattle. The habitat for prairie dogs, black-footed ferrets, bison, wolves and grizzly bears shrank dramatically. During the late 19th and early 20th centuries, many national parks, national forests, and other federal lands were designated and protected. Prairies were generally overlooked as mountainous areas that were relatively unproductive for western settlement, or forest reserves that could provide the nation a steady supply of timber were recognized.

Eastern Montana's population has been falling since the 1930s. Nearly two-thirds of counties in the Great Plains declined in population between 1950 and 2007. Land is for sale as aging ranchers find it difficult for family members take over their spreads. Ranching is hard in this area with severe winter weather and hot summers. Rains can be heavy and hard or instead there might be an extended dry spell. Rural agricultural communities in Montana are challenged by trade policies, regulations and industry dynamics. Margins with cattle raising can be slim. Large spreads can be worth millions. Rural recreation counties with hiking, hunting and fishing opportunities are growing faster than counties without those amenities. In general, this region of the country is becoming less dependent on natural resource extraction and more focused on conservation, natural amenities, and recreation.

The Nature Conservancy determined in 1999 that the northern Great Plains were the most viable for restoring the region's habitats and conserving the existing diversity of plants and animals. The upper Missouri River and its banks within the Charles M. Russell National Wildlife Refuge (Russell NWR) had been designated a National Wild and Scenic River in 1976. The relatively pristine condition of the land and the diversity of wildlife species north of Russell NWR was identified as a top priority for grassland conservation. The adjacent 377,000-acre (589 sq mi; 1,526 km^{2}) Upper Missouri River Breaks National Monument was created in 2001 with public lands that were mostly already managed by the federal government. The area, managed by the Bureau of Land Management, is series of badlands characterized by rock outcroppings, steep bluffs, and grassy plains; a topography referred to as "The Breaks" as the land appears to "break away" to the river. Shortly after The Nature Conservancy issued the report, the World Wildlife Fund decided to initiate a conservation effort in the Montana Glaciated Plains and determined that an independent entity was needed that would be capable of focusing all of its time and resources on the preservation effort.

== History ==
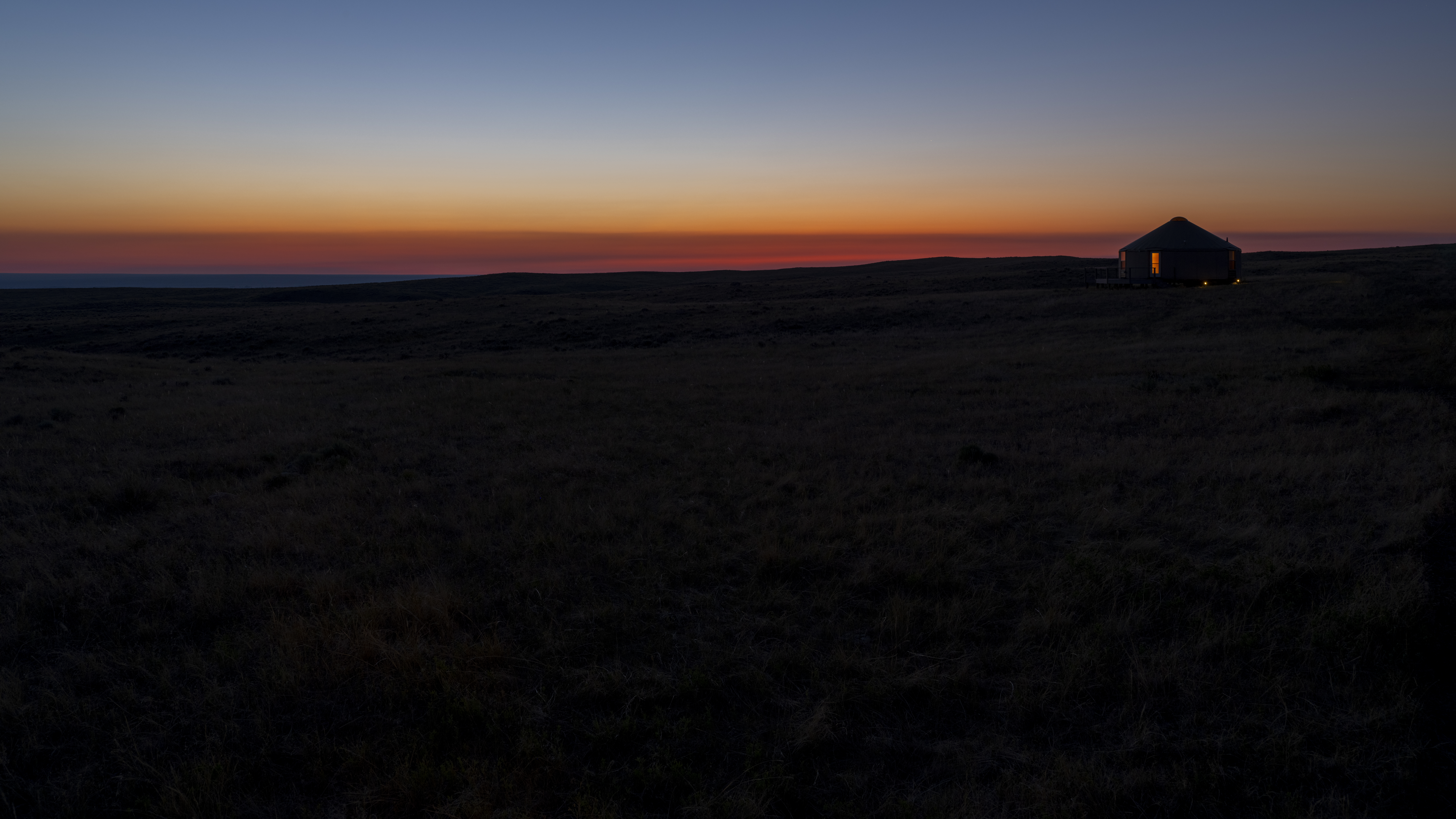
American Prairie in 2021

The American Prairie Foundation was formed in 2001 as an independent, non-profit organization with the mission conserving the existing diversity of plants and animals as a refuge for people and wildlife. They ultimately envision a wildlife conservation area over 3 million contiguous acres (12,000 km^{2}) through a combination of both private and public lands with a fully-functioning mixed grass prairie ecosystem. With the Russell NWR and Upper Missouri River Breaks National Monument together already encompassing nearly 1.3 million acres, self-sustaining populations of native wildlife with big migration patterns are possible. Native vegetation and prairie dogs are encouraged. It could also support the return of predators such as grizzly bears and wolves. Purchased from willing sellers, ranches come with associated grazing leases on vast expanses of public land managed by the Bureau of Land Management (BLM). AP requests a livestock change under BLM rules, as bison are considered a class of livestock, along with a change to the allotment grazing season to year-round grazing. In many cases, fencing formerly used to manage cattle or delineate the boundary of the separate ranches, are removed to allow the natural movement of wildlife. A ranch can have hundreds of miles of fences. They intend to retain ownership in perpetuity which includes lease payments for BLM grazing lands and payment of property taxes to the local government.

The neighboring Indigenous communities, that provide opportunities for conservation and connection, include Fort Belknap Indian Community to the west, Fort Peck Assiniboine and Sioux to the east, and the Chippewa Cree Rocky Boy Tribes to the northwest. The Timber Creek property acquisition in 2012 of more than 150,000 acres (61,000 ha) of deeded and leased public land shares a 16-mile border (26 km) with the Russell NWR. While purchasing ranches, 63,777 acres (25,810 ha) of leased-public land within the Russell NWR has been retired by returning it to wildlife management purposes after being used for cattle ranching. In 2021, the American Prairie Reserve was rebranded as American Prairie. In July 2022, the public's access was facilitated by the enrollment of nearly 10,000 acres (4,000 ha) into the block management hunter program of the recently acquired 73 Ranch which supports healthy populations of elk, mule deer, pronghorn, turkeys, pheasants and waterfowl. The general public also began being able to travel throughout the property to an additional 9,300 acres (3,800 ha) of public lands that were previously landlocked and unavailable. An adult grizzly bear was photographed in 2023 by a game camera on the PN Ranch northeast of Winifred. The roughly 50,000-acre ranch (20,000 ha) at the mouth of the Judith and Missouri rivers was purchased in 2016 and is the most westerly of AP properties. This is the farthest east a grizzly has been seen in Montana in more than 100 years. Northern Continental Divide Ecosystem where grizzlies roam mountain wilderness areas is more than 100 miles (160 km) west. Grizzly bears take advantage of river bottoms for cover and are well-adapted to life on the prairie as at one time they occupied most of the Great Plains. As of October 2023, 40 land acquisitions have been made. As of June 2024, the Reserve owns 137,995 acres (55,845 ha) and controls the leasing rights on another 337,342 acres (136,517 ha) state and federal acres. Their holdings increased in 2024 when they acquired the Lazy J5 ranch adjacent to the White Rock unit and another parcel near the Upper Missouri River Breaks National Monument.

== Bison management, cooperative programs, and reactions ==
In 2005, 16 bison from Wind Cave National Park in South Dakota were released. A series of plains bison deliveries totaling about 180 were also made from Elk Island National Park between 2011 and 2016. These herds have minimal cattle gene introgression. As of 2020, the 800 bison move freely throughout the Sun Prairie unit and portions of the Dry Fork and White Rock units of the reserve. While the majority of the grazing has been on their deeded holdings, the BLM in 2022 authorized converting permits on some leased lands which would allow American Prairie to grow the herd to 1,000 animals by 2025. In Montana, bison are legally classified as domestic livestock. The bison are managed under applicable state laws while minimizing livestock handling techniques. The bison are sourced from certified brucellosis-free herds and are vaccinated and disease-tested like other livestock in the state. The reserve installs proper fencing to keep bison contained within the specific sites, including a solar-powered electric wire strung across all exterior wildlife friendly fencing. Semi-annual bison handling operations are held to complying with state and federal regulations, monitor overall herd health and maintain appropriate stocking rates. Blood samples are taken for disease work, and hair samples for genetic testing and trace mineral sampling. Bison are give an ear tag and PIT tag if the animal does not have them.

=== Native tribal nations ===
The land has been the home of generations of Indigenous people, including the Aaniiih (Gros Ventre), the Niitsitapi / Pikuni (Blackfeet), the Nakoda / Nakona (Assiniboine), the Lakota / Dakota (Sioux), Apsáalooke (Crow), Ojibwe / Annishinabe / Ne-i-yah-wahk (Chippewa Cree), and Métis (Little Shell Chippewa). The organization prioritizes distributing bison to Native tribal nations with active and well-managed bison restoration programs. The organization's goal is to share with those who have a similar vision of moving bison conservation forward. These partnerships are with Native tribes who are working to restore a deeper cultural, spiritual and economic connection to bison. AP regularly distributes or exchanges bison to enhance the genetic health of conservation and tribal herds. Thirty-five bison were donated in February 2021 to the Wolakota Buffalo Range in South Dakota along with an intent to contribute up to 170 bison to the herd.

=== Wildlife-friendly ranch management ===
American Prairie leases grass to local ranchers for approximately 10,000 head of cattle on its properties in Phillips, Valley, Fergus, Blaine and Petroleum counties. Ranchers in the region were also invited to adhere to certain wildlife-friendly standards through American Prairie's Wild Sky ranching program. The wildlife-friendly ranch management is contingent on continuing to leave the native prairie untilled. Nine other standards individually increase the premiums paid out: installing wildlife-friendly fences, rejuvenating native plant communities through prescribed burns, keeping cattle out of riparian areas, and agreeing not to harm predators. Enrolled landowners using motion-sensing camera traps set up on their properties can earn per-species payments for images captured of large carnivores such as cougar or black bear. The data collected helps AP and other landowners learn how wildlife uses their property. The ranching community in Phillips County has also responded to programs by The Nature Conservancy that include progressive efforts such as bird counts, managing their land to promote wildlife, and using rotational grazing techniques often referred to as "regenerative agriculture", which emphasizes grassland health as much as beef sales. The 60,000-acre Matador Ranch (24,000 ha) within the American Prairie focal area is owned by the Nature Conservancy. Ranchers who pledge to follow wildlife-friendly practices on their own land can graze cattle at a low cost on the ranch. The Family South Ranch had a Montana Fish, Wildlife & Parks’ conservation easement before being acquired by American Prairie. This program puts limits on development, requires a sustainable livestock grazing plan, and allows public access for hunting and fishing.

=== Reactions by cattle ranchers and legislators ===
The reception for the creation of the reserve among the ranchers in the sparsely populated area has been mixed. There has been a strong reaction from many who intend to continue grazing cattle. Bison in Montana are a controversial topic although they are raised for meat in other parts of Montana and throughout the United States. The idea of free-ranging bison in the area raises concerns about disease with anything from anthrax and mad cow disease to bovine brucellosis, competition for forage by elk and deer, public safety and damage to private property such as fencing. Evidence of the continuing concerns can be seen in signs posted with the message "Save The Cowboy, Stop The American Prairie Reserve" and organized opposition such as the United Property Owners of Montana and the Ranchers Stewardship Alliance of South Phillips County. The designation of the Upper Missouri River Breaks National Monument in 2001 was viewed by some ranchers as a federal land grab that would ultimately displace them although it allowed for the continuation of existing grazing permits. There is a sentiment that the reserve is threatening and lacks respect for a culture that for more than 150 years has preserved the unplowed prairie that now makes this the ideal location where the vision to return this landscape to what it was like before white settlers arrived can be fulfilled. Ranching families are losing their neighbors as cattle ranches are purchased for the reserve. A longtime rancher and property owner, who is within the bounds of the planned reserve, says this is an assault on her business, culture and those living and working here and that the area is good for growing production livestock which has been the highest purpose of the land for over 100 years.

The plan for the reserve is clear that it will be amidst an area where the predominant economic activity will remain the raising of cattle on homestead parcels along with adjacent rangeland leased from the federal government. AP's vice president and chief external relations officer estimated that there is a half a million head of cattle in the seven county area where AP is based and seeks to be a good neighbor. Bison under Montana law are classified as private livestock overseen by the Department of Livestock. APF requested a modification of the terms of the grazing permits it had acquired to allow for year-round grazing and a change of use from cattle to bison grazing in Chouteau, Fergus, Petroleum, Phillips and Valley counties. The proposal included fortifying existing external boundary fences by replacing the second strand from the top with an electrified wire, converting to wildlife-friendly standards, and removing interior fences. AP reduced the initial request in 2017 for grazing allotments on 290,000 to 63,000 acres (117,000 to 25,000 ha) of federal land in Phillips County only with 10 year leases. While the decision only applies to the BLM land, the bison project area includes 5,830 acres (2,360 ha) of state land administered by the Montana Department of Natural Resources and Conservation and 32,710 acres (13,240 ha) of AP deeded land.

In 2019, the Montana House of Representatives passed a resolution asking the U.S. Bureau of Land Management (BLM) to deny the bison grazing proposal from the American Prairie. The BLM issued a proposed decision approving various elements of the proposal in March 2022. The BLM cited research that the bison grazing will increase plant and animal diversity, improve water quality, and overall habitat conditions. The BLM made its official decision in July which was justified by an analysis that showed the plan would not have a significant environmental impact. Montana Stockgrowers Association, Governor Greg Gianforte and Montana Attorney General Austin Knudsen filed appeals to the approval. These federal grazing lands are intermixed with state trust lands which are managed by the BLM for the state. A revised fencing regime was adopted to avoid state trust lands. Bison are often the target of bills before the state legislature. Other bills have sought to limit APF's activities as a nonprofit organization that acquires property.

In 2026, their permit to graze its bison on federal land was revoked by the second Trump administration which sided with cattle ranchers and Montana Republicans.

=== Research ===
Papers published include studies of beavers, cougars, upland game birds like the greater sage-grouse, bison and pronghorn migration ecology, and research on the endangered swift fox. The Smithsonian Conservation Biology Institute began studies in 2018 on how grazing cattle and bison affect biodiversity and the biodiversity of prairie dogs. This will assist in designing a restoration program for black-footed ferrets. A Smithsonian project sought to identify how grazing patterns of different mammals (bison, cattle, prairie dogs) impacted the abundance and diversity of plant and insect communities. Another study involved the collective movement behavior of the bison on the 26,000-acre (11,000 ha) Sun Prairie unit. Using a lightweight, inexpensive, solar-powered GPS tracking unit attached to the ear, they are studying how groups make decisions and move together as a unit.

== Access ==
The National Discovery Center in Lewistown is a gateway facility for visitors and Montana residents. The center has interactive exhibits, a children's learning zone, and a theater that presents films on topics such as wildlife, American history, and conservation. The reserve is in a remote area with gateway towns providing lodging and dining options; Lewistown and Winifred are south and Malta is north of the reserve.

The reserve is improving public access and enjoyment of this unique natural habitat. Recreation opportunities including fishing, birding, hiking, paddling, and cycling. Various camping options are available on the reserve. The reserve has established nine-bunk huts and campgrounds including some less remote for RV access. The reserve offers access points to state and federal public lands through its deeded lands, some of which were previously landlocked and unavailable. These public lands were surrounded by private land so although technically owned by the public, they were unavailable for public use until the adjacent ranches were acquired for the reserve. The public lands are subject to state and federal hunting and camping regulations for the respective governing agencies.

Certain areas are open by permit for rifle and bow hunting of upland birds, migratory birds, deer, elk and antelope including on the Blue Ridge, White Rock and PN ranches. They have more than 80,000 acres (32,000 ha) enrolled in Block Management Program managed by Montana Fish, Wildlife & Parks. Annual drawings are held for the opportunity to harvest bison. The bison are not considered wildlife to be hunted but as livestock as they roam within the fenced 27,000 acres (11,000 ha) Sun Prairie unit. APF uses the harvest as a bison management tool and to control the population size.

The reserve hosts various artist-in-residence programs. Artists are exposed to the cultural, ecological, and historic value of the site.

== In popular culture ==
Ken Burns's 2023 film The American Buffalo includes scenes shot on the reserve.

In March 2023, David Pogue's podcast, Unsung Science, mentions American Prairie on an episode discussing rewilding at the Knepp Wildland.

== See also ==
- List of protected grasslands of North America
- List of mammals of Montana
- Algonquin to Adirondacks Collaborative
- Buffalo Commons
- Yellowstone to Yukon Conservation Initiative
