= Protected area mosaic =

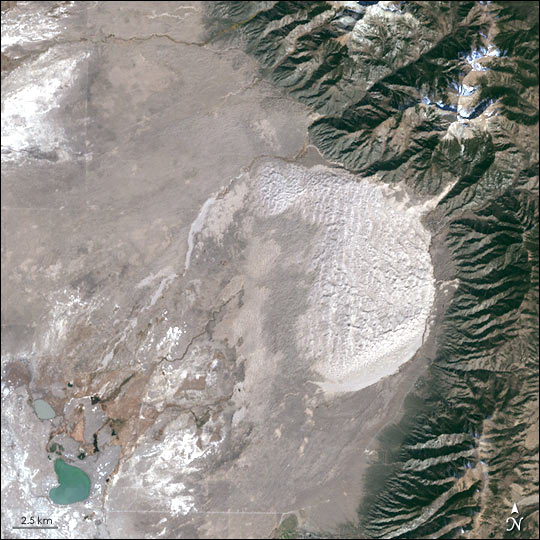
Great Sand Dunes National Park and Preserve in Colorado, US

A protected area mosaic, or conservation mosaic is a collection of environmentally protected areas that are treated as a whole, either formally or informally. The protected areas may be of different types, including strictly protected areas and sustainable use areas, which may be administered at different public levels or privately. They may include areas assigned to indigenous people. A mosaic may be more flexible and effective than an attempt to combine all the areas into a single conservation unit under one agency. In practice, results with mosaics in different countries have been mixed.

== Definition ==
A conservation mosaic may be defined as "a network of protected areas and complementary landscapes that include combinations of national parks (i.e. the core conservation areas), production landscapes and collectively-owned ethnic territories (i.e. the surrounding areas)". Conservation mosaics are similar to the biospheres promoted by UNESCO under the Man and the Biosphere Programme. The cooperative approach between different agencies and types of protected area avoids the conflicts and disagreements over land use and conservation that often result with a single agency and single type of conservation unit. The value of creating protected area mosaics has been the subject of intense debate among conservationists. Protected areas are of great importance in protecting biodiversity, but conservation efforts must take into account the social and economic needs of the surrounding communities and the resulting pressure on land usage.

== National examples ==
=== Brazil ===
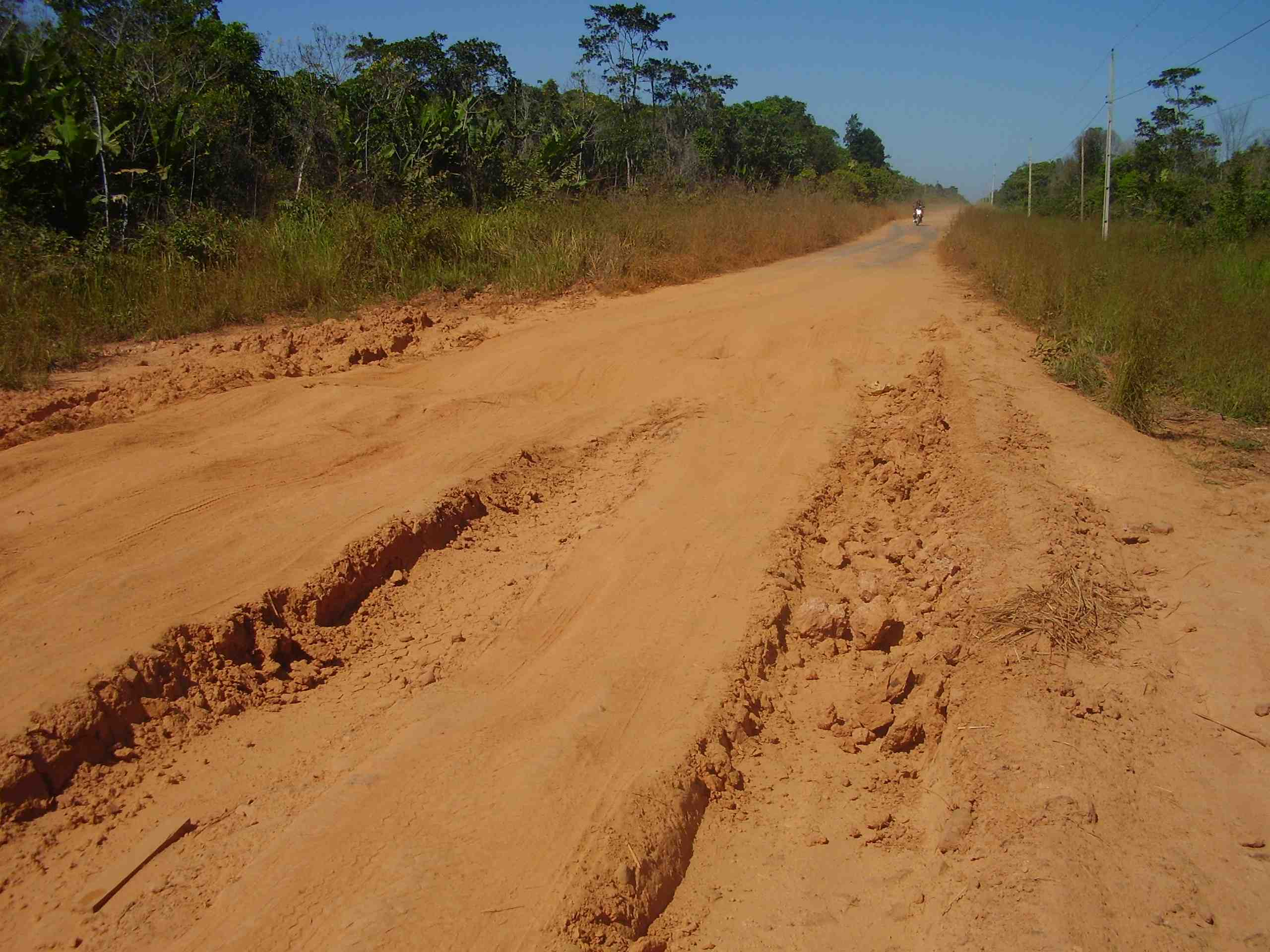
BR-319. A protected area mosaic has been defined in an effort to reduce deforestation when the road is paved.

A mosaico de unidades de conservação is a legally recognized entity in Brazil, a collection of protected areas of the same or different categories that are near to each other, adjoin each other or overlap, and that should be managed as a whole. It may include conservation units, private lands and indigenous territories. Brazil has created a mosaic of federal and state conservation units along the BR-319 highway through the Amazon rainforest in an effort to better prevent deforestation when the highway is paved through more efficient management of a larger area. However, WWF-Brazil has pointed out that it is not enough to simply create the protected areas on paper. They must be staffed, delimited, legal owners compensated and so on.

The Chapada dos Veadeiros National Park in the state of Goiás, Brazil, was expanded by Federal Decree in September 2001 and inscribed as a UNESCO World Heritage Site in December 2001. In 2003 the expansion was successfully challenged and 72% of the national park lost its protection status. The park is part of the Cerrado Biosphere Reserve. Brazil has outlined plans for a mosaic of new conservation units with different management categories covering an equivalent area to the expanded National Park, but UNESCO has questioned whether the mosaic will be sufficient to ensure the statutory protection required for the World Heritage properties.

=== Colombia ===
A 2015 World Bank report on national protected areas in Colombia covering at least 2,000,000 hectares (4,900,000 acres) found that with the mosaic approach ecological connectivity had improved in eight of the mosaics, exceeding the target. The local farmers and fishing communities in seven of the conservation mosaics, which included protected areas and their surrounding buffer zones, benefited from sustainable provision and use of environmental goods and services.

=== Kenya ===
In northern Kenya the Northern Rangelands Trust (NRT) organisation covers 19 community conservancies with more than 3,000,000 acres (1,200,000 ha) of wildlife habitat. The NRT Council of Elders agreed in May 2010 to found the Nakuprat – Gotu Community Conservancy beside the Shaba National Reserve and the Ewaso Ng'iro river to promote conflict resolution and conserve nature. The conservancy is part of a protected area mosaic that is a vital habitat for species that include the African elephant and the endangered Grévy's zebra.

=== United Kingdom ===
A mosaic of protected areas has evolved in the United Kingdom, with a growing number of types of protected area, some as a result of European Union directives. The objectives of nature conservation and landscape protection are treated as distinct. The mosaic has evolved in a manner that results in duplication of effort and funding. It could benefit from rationalisation and more flexible administration.

=== United States ===
The protected area mosaics of the Great Sand Dunes, El Malpais, San Pedro and Las Cienegas areas in Colorado, New Mexico and Arizona have been assembled by a variety of government and non-government organisations to protect the environment while respecting land use demands of the southwest of the United States. This broad approach to ecosystem planning and management seems more fair and effective than former single-agency approaches. The Great Sand Dunes Monument Area combined various type of protected area to satisfy the objectives of the National Park Service, The Nature Conservancy and other organizations, and to combine conservation and sustainable use of the ecosystem. The result was similar to the protected area mosaic recommended in the early 1980s for parts of the Yukon in Canada. Implementation was staged, with many interactions and adaptations over time.

== Sources ==
- Bishop, K.; Phillips, A.; Warren, L. M., "Protected Areas for the Future: Models from the Past", IDEAS
- Caballero, Paula; Battaglini, Emilia; Lagnaoui, Abdelaziz (18 April 2015), Colombia national protected areas conservation trust fund project, World Bank
- Cerrado Protected Areas: Chapada dos Veadeiros and Emas National Parks, UNESCO, 2012
- Conservation International (15 October 2009), Biodiversity Corridor Planning and Implementation Program (PDF), USAID, archived from the original (PDF) on May 27, 2010
- Day, John Chadwick; Nelson, James Gordon; Sportza, Lucy M. (2003), Protected Areas and the Regional Planning Imperative in North America: Integrating Nature Conservation and Sustainable Development, University of Calgary Press, ISBN 978-1-55238-084-0
- Mosaicos de áreas protegidas (in Portuguese), ISA: Instituto Socioambiental, archived from the original on 2016-06-20
- Nakuprat Conservancy, Tusk
- Nelson, Gordon (2005), "Protected Area Mosaics and Cooperative Ecosystem-Based Land-Use and Conservation Planning: Four Case Studies in the U.S. West" (PDF), Ecosystem Management, vol. PRFO Proceedings, Parks Research Forum of Ontario
- Six new protected areas created in Brazilian Amazonian state, IUCN, 27 March 2009
