= Mixed grass prairie =

Ecotone located between tall and shortgrass prairie

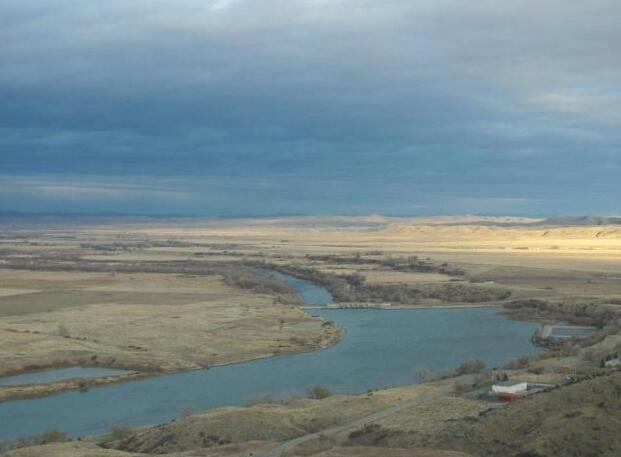
Mixed grass prairie around the Afterbay near Fort Smith, Montana

Mixed grass prairie in relation to the Great Plains Shortgrass prairie Mixed grass prairie Tallgrass prairie

A mixed-grass prairie is an ecotone located between the tallgrass prairies and shortgrass prairies. The mixed-grass prairie is richer in botanical diversity than either the tall- or shortgrass prairie. The mixed-grass prairie occurs in the central plains portion of the Great Plains, varying in width from central Texas in the United States up into southeastern Manitoba, Alberta and Saskatchewan in the northern mixed grasslands of Canada.

== See also ==
American Prairie	Nine Mile Prairie
Buffalo Commons	Oglala National Grassland
Buffalo Gap National Grassland	Texas blackland prairies
Central Plains Biosphere Reserve	Theodore Roosevelt National Park
Missouri Coteau	Valentine National Wildlife Refuge
Drift Prairie	Wichita Mountains Wildlife Refuge
Nebraska Sand Hills	Wind Cave National Park
