= American Prairie Foundation =

Nonprofit organization in Montana

- Predecessor: The Prairie Foundation
- Formation: June 2001; 25 years ago
- Founder: Sean Gerrity
- Type: Nonprofit
- Tax ID no.: 81-0541893
- Purpose: Create and manage large nature reserve
- Headquarters: PO Box 908
- Location: Bozeman, Montana 59771, United States
- Region served: Northeastern Montana
- Fields: Conservation research and tourism
- Chief Executive Officer: Alison Fox
- Website: www.americanprairie.org
- Remarks: Doing business as American Prairie

The American Prairie Foundation is a nonprofit organization located in the U.S. state of Montana. The foundation's objective is to build one of the largest wildlife reserves in the continental United States through a combination of new land acquisition and public land integration into the project, called the American Prairie. To accomplish this, the foundation estimates that it must acquire 500,000 acres (2,000 km^{2}) privately, which would then link together over 3,000,000 acres (12,000 km^{2}) of existing public property. The Charles M. Russell National Wildlife Refuge is one of the project's anchor properties.

The American Prairie Foundation (doing business as American Prairie) seeks to create a landscape reminiscent of that seen by the Lewis and Clark Expedition. The American Prairie Foundation developed a 7-point scale to evaluate land based on ten ecological conditions including plant diversity, grazing, fire, hydrology and predators to measure the impact of reserve management activities.

Approximately ten percent of the funding comes from private foundations supporting land conservation and the remaining ninety percent comes from individuals living in 46 states and eight countries. Approximately 20% of its donors reside in the state of Montana. As of December 2013, they had raised $67.3 million in cash and pledges since 2002.

== See also ==
- Algonquin to Adirondacks Collaborative
- Buffalo Commons
- Yellowstone to Yukon Conservation Initiative
