= Grazing pressure =

Number of grazing animals per unit weight of herbage

Grazing pressure is defined as the number of grazing animals of a specified class (age, species, physiological status like pregnant) per unit weight of herbage (herbage biomass). It is well established in general usage.

== Definition ==
Grazing pressure is the demand for feed from herbivores and detritivores within an environment compared to the amount available for consumption. This could come from domestic animals, such as goats and cattle; feral animals, such as rabbits; and wild animals, such as insects, rodents, kangaroos, water buffalo, or moose. Even some microbes are grazers. Total grazing pressure is the ratio of the demand for forage and the supply of forage available. Demand can come from both livestock and native or feral animals. Grassland ecosystems in particular have evolved in the presence of grazing from large herbivores and are well-adapted to it.

== Livestock grazing pressure ==
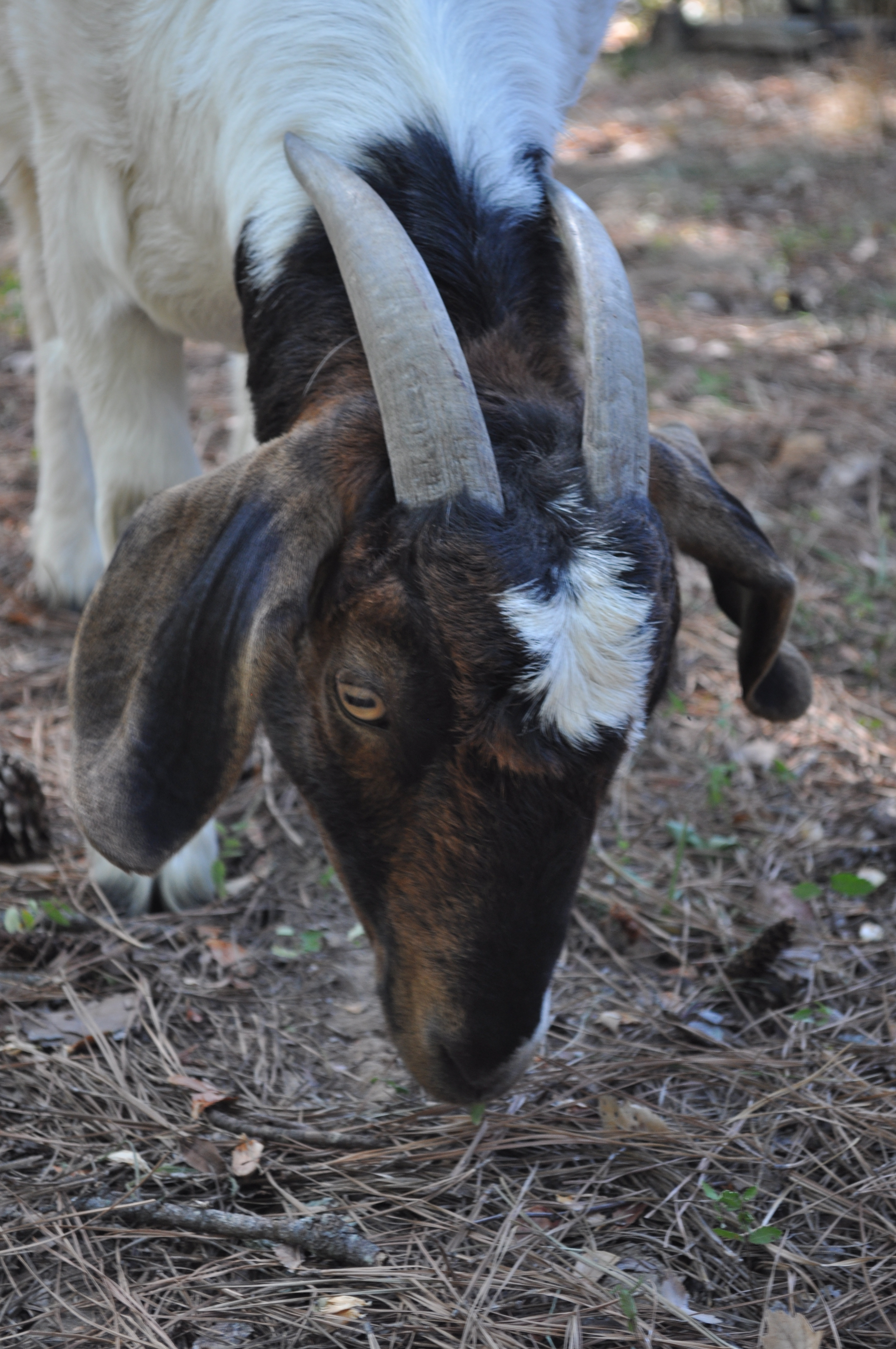
Goat grazing

Grazing pressure due to livestock can be regulated and controlled more easily compared to that from native and feral animals. Rather than use open fields for grazing among domestic animals, cereal pastures may be used as an alternative. This reduces the grazing pressure on local shrublands. In areas of the Mediterranean, both mature goats and their kids were found to affect local shrubbery. Older goats spent about a third of their time grazing in the shrubs, while their young spent at least half their time. The amount of time spent in each type of grazing are also correlated with the genotype of the goat. While the goats were found in the pastures a majority of the time, their grazing patterns still affected local wildlife and shrub growth. Grazing pressure is not only a problem regarding natural grasslands and shrubbery. In northwestern Europe, the rising goose population has caused an increase in grazing pressure on agricultural lands.

== Within the environment ==
=== On land ===
Disturbance of plant life caused by the grazing of large herbivores can be an important determinant of plant community structure. The composition of plant and animal species can be affected by grazing pressure in some environments, in others, the environmental characteristics of the site, including weather and climate, may be more important. Grazing affects plant communities directly through physical removal of plant parts. It can also affect plant communities indirectly by modulation of ecosystem productivity or by changing the pattern of nutrient partitioning of nutrients among different sizes of plants. Thus, grazing can change the population size, diversity and distribution of organisms in an ecosystem. Grazing pressure also influences plant species performance and plant ecological stoichiometry. For instance, plant functional composition of tundra is primary structured by grazing pressure.

Some studies suggest grazing may be beneficial in nutrient-rich conditions and harmful in habitats poor in nutrients. In other cases grazing will not affect ecosystems whatsoever. For instance, in the Mongolian rain forest, Cheng et al. have found that grazing pressure plays a highly, positive important role in species richness in the wetter steppe of the rain forest. The same research has found that in the dryer, desert ecosystem grazing pressure did not affect species richness significantly. Introductions of new types of grazing pressure can change ecosystems if the plants are not adapted to it.

In a study performed by Saccone et al., when experimenting with biodiversity in the Fennoscandia tundra, they found that there was an increase in species richness associated with decrease of shrub cover. It was shown that in the Fennoscandia tundra grazing is an important and efficient biotic filter restricting the spread of dwarf shrubs to mountain tundra snowbeds. In other words, because of grazing and fewer shrubs, there was more biodiversity among the species.

There are mechanisms that plants use to defend themselves against the grazing pressure of herbivores. Carbon-based secondary metabolites inhibit digestion in herbivores. Tough leaves provide physical defense against herbivores. On the other hand, other features of plants may make them more susceptible to herbivores. For example, leaves that are high in nitrogen have a higher dietary value for herbivores. Also, taller plants and forbs are often more sensitive to grazing, while shorter herbs can avoid the grazing by being overlooked by the grazing animals.

=== In water ===
In the ocean, grazing pressure tends to increase with decreasing latitude. Many aquatic herbivores graze on phytoplankton: algae that float on the surface of the ocean or are suspended in the water column. With phytoplankton being the main primary producers, grazing on it is the dominant form of grazing in ocean ecosystems. Other form of grazing include grazing on macroalgae anchored at the bottom (kelp) and benthic (bottom dwelling) algae. As a result of the grazing pressure, algae has to divert their energy away from growth and put into repair and the production of chemical defenses against the herbivores. This also means diverting their energy from reproduction. Therefore, the growth of algae in the ocean often depends on herbivores. Furthermore, the eating of algae by animals is not only affecting the algae, but also the ocean community as a whole. As the grazing may limit algae growth and amount of energy transferred to other trophic levels being consumed, the photosynthetic is lost and the ability to fix carbon reduces and diminishes overall growth.

Kelp in coastal water shelters the water column from UV radiation and protects the coasts from waves and storms. Grazing pressure can decrease this protection and shelter. For example, the kelp Macrocytis pyrifera may grow up to 40m. The basal parts of this kelp body are shaded by the surface canopies and are therefore protected, and the undifferentiated cell tissue is exposed to surface levels of UV radiation. Grazing can detach parts of the kelp and the entire reproducing part of the algae in the Macrocytis pyifera becomes suddenly exposed to surface levels of UV radiation.

In a study produced by Rothausler et al., kelps that were not exposed to UV radiation were consumed more by grazers than those kelps that were exposed to UV radiation.

== On a microbial level ==
While grazing pressure is more commonly thought in larger herbivores such as cattle, geese, and goats, it is also found within bacterium and on a more microbial level. Leaf-litter colonizing bacteria are a type of bacterium that have been studied regarding grazing pressure on a smaller scale. While it seems that grazing pressure in such a localized environment would not have any large effects, one study found the opposite. Conducted in 2014, researchers found that when they added nitrogen and phosphorus, as well as increased the temperature, it increased the density of the bacteria within a freshwater environment. While this was a controlled experiment, there are real life consequences that should be considered as global warming becomes a greater issue. If the populations of bacteria increase enough then it is possible that the grazing pressure will reach a detrimental level. Once it reaches this peak, the bacteria will have depleted their food resources and may perhaps cause a collapse within the environmental food chain in that area.

Another negative effect caused by grazing pressure was found in mangrove forest soils. Sulfate, which is used in the oxidation of organic matter, is dependent on the surplus of carbon left by aerobic organisms due to oxygen depletion. When a mix of tidal exposure and camel grazing pressure were placed on the habitat, there was a decrease in primary production, which in turn affected sulfate-cycling. A decrease in sulfate-cycling could cause the trees in the forest to slow down their oxidation process.

== Mitigation ==
The native kangaroo population in Australia is kept under control by hunters. This helps to contain the grazing pressure level while turning a profit for locals. Hunters must abide by a quota set by the Australian federal government. Kangaroo hunting is an effective control method in open areas but are less effective in dense areas where human accessibility is limited. While effective in the native kangaroo population, shooting is not effective within the goat population where herds are much larger. Instead, large herds are mustered together by a plane or trapped. Trapping is illegal within the kangaroo population.

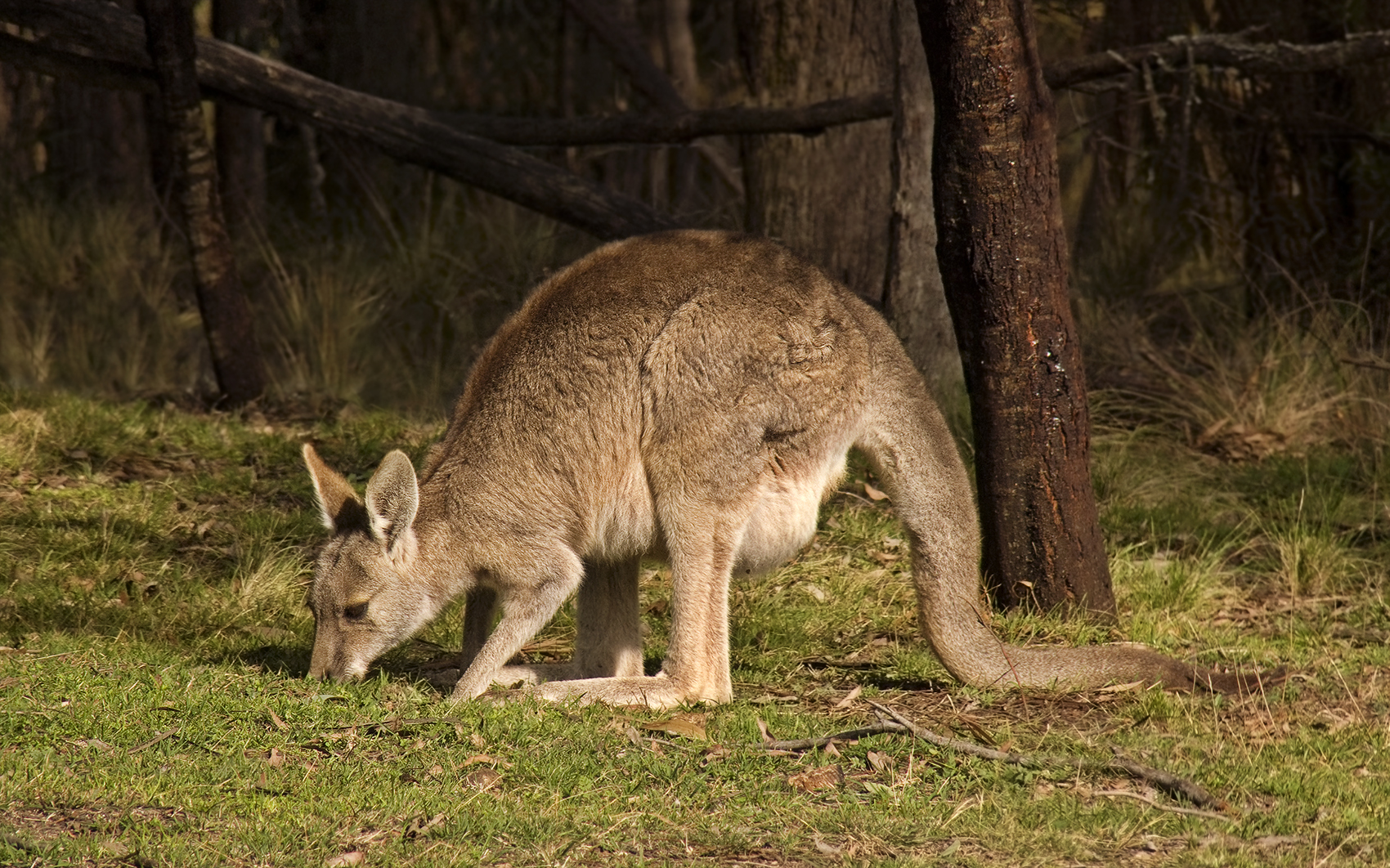
Eastern Grey Kangaroo Grazing

Another method of population control is limiting the water in the area. Australian governments have been known to cap bores or troughs in order to get feral kangaroos or goats to move on. Some farmers have created kangaroo-proof fences with swing or trap gates that allows cattle and sheep in but keeps other animals out. These fences protect water sources and pastures, forcing kangaroos to move on elsewhere for resources. One problem with this method of reducing grazing pressure in one area, is simply pushing the problem on neighboring pastures and croplands.

In other areas of the world, such as Europe, where rising goose levels are becoming a problem for local agricultural pastures, other ideas have been contemplated. It was proposed that by managing nature reserves in the area, this might help decrease the negative effect of grazing pressure on farmland. By increasing the number of geese that can make use of the native flora on the reserves, this will cut costs for the crops lost to geese grazing on farmlands.
