= Paula Caballero =

Climate activist and diplomat

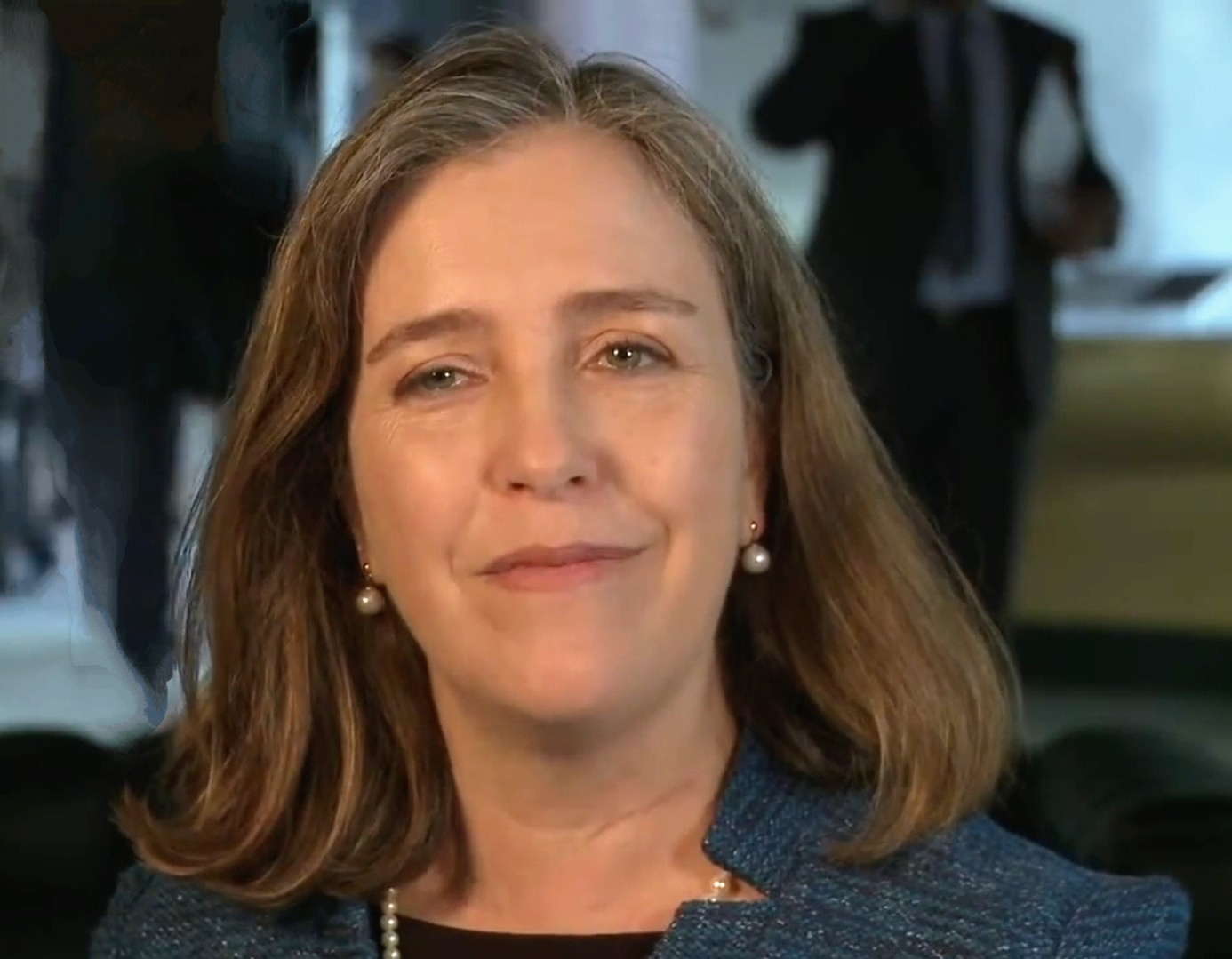
- Citizenship: Colombia

Paula Caballero is a Colombian climate activist and diplomat. As early as COP1 in 1995, she has been involved in climate negotiations as head of Colombia's delegation. She was the director of the Environment and Natural Resources at the World Bank from 2014-2016. As of April 2023, she serves as the regional managing director for Latin America at The Nature Conservancy (TNC).

== Early life ==
Paula Caballero is the granddaughter of Helena Laverde de Gomez. Paula Caballero studied at Brown University where she completed a BA in history and a master's degree in international relations. After she graduated from Brown University, she returned to Bogota, Colombia, and worked as a researcher at the Center for International Development at Universidad de los Andes. Over the years, she worked a variety of jobs around the world in such places as Bogota, London and New York.

== 17 Sustainable Development Goals ==
Paula Caballero conceptualized the 17 Sustainable Development Goals (SDGs) as goals that would replace the Millennial Development Goals (MDGs) proposed in 2000. The MDGs did not do enough for environmental sustainability and focused only on developing countries. She first presented them to the United Nations in Solo, Indonesia but they did not go under discussion. The committee reconvened in Rio de Janeiro in 2012, but only Guatemala had signed on. An important topic of debate was the whether or not too many goals were included. The SDG proposal almost died at G77, but Indian delegate Vivek Wadekar reminded the summit that the text had already been accepted. For a few years, the text of the goals was further developed through an open working group. In 2015, the General Assembly of the United Nations adopted the SDGs.

She recounts her experience of trying to push the SDGs to the United Nations in her book, Redefining Development: The Extraordinary Genesis of the Sustainable Development Goals. In 2019, she received the German Sustainability Prize with German President Joachim Gauck and Mick Hucknall. In 2022, she gave the commencement speech to the graduating class of the Universidad de los Andes.

== The Nature Conservancy (TNC) ==
Caballero continues to work on social and climate problems through the Nature Conservancy. In her role, she works both on changing public policy and with the private sector on financial flow.
