= Utah Buffalo Herd =

Utah Buffalo Herd may refer to:

- Antelope Island Bison Herd
- Henry Mountains Bison Herd
