= Utah Bison Herd =

Utah Bison Herd may refer to:

- Antelope Island Bison Herd
- Henry Mountains Bison Herd
