= Fielding Garr Ranch =

Fielding Garr Ranch, Antelope Island State Park
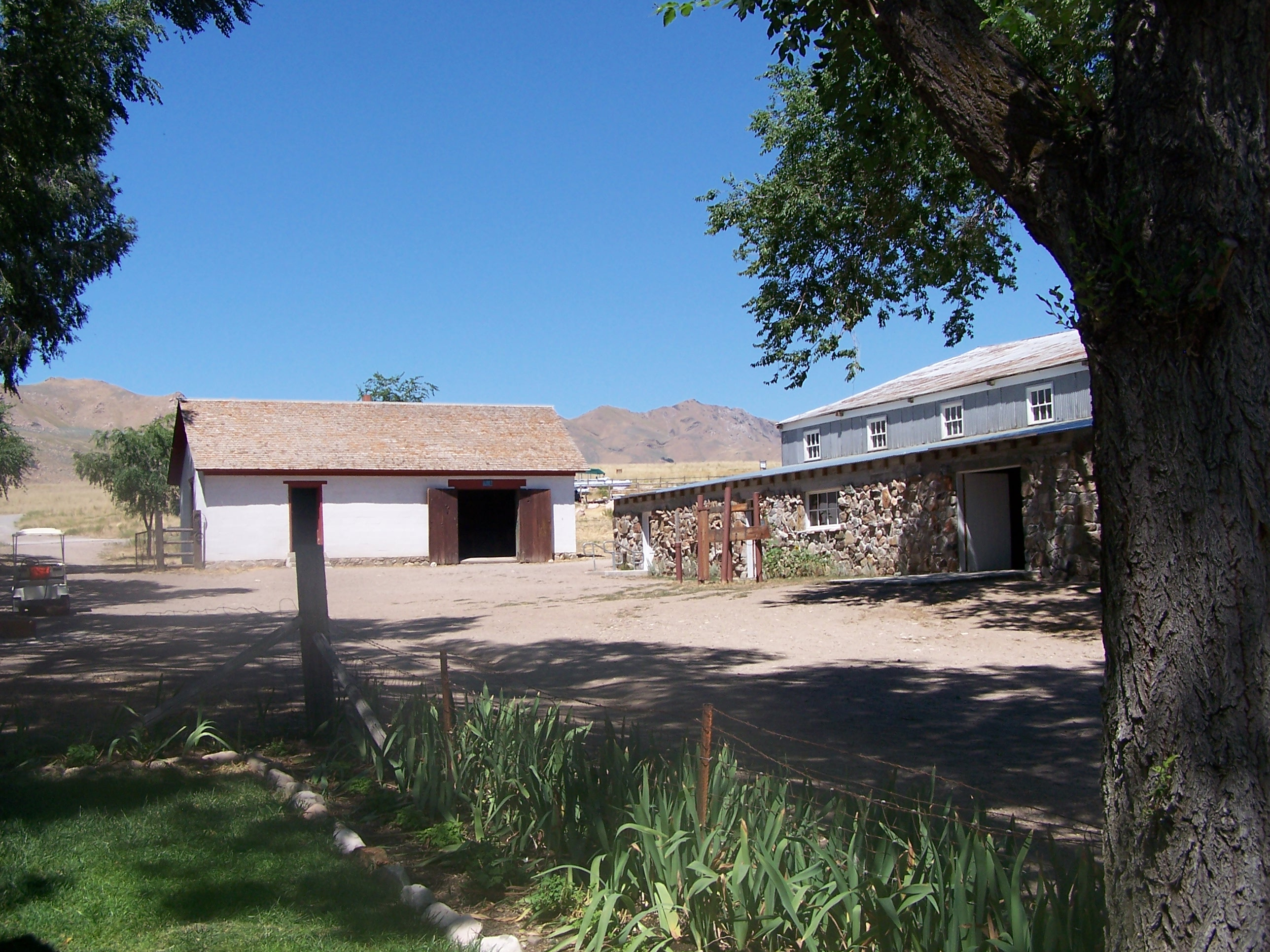
- Ranch Established 1848 on Antelope Island

- Location within Utah Location within the United States
- Location: Davis, Utah, United States
- Coordinates: 40°57′29″N 112°12′26″W
- Elevation: 4,350 ft (1,330 m)
- Established: 1848
- Named for: Fielding Garr
- Visitors: 280351 (in 2010)
- Governing body: Utah State Parks
- Website: Antelope Island State Park

- Fielding Garr Ranch
- U.S. National Register of Historic Places
- Location: Off UT 127, Antelope Island, Utah
- Coordinates: 40°55′31″N 112°09′59″W
- Area: 6.2 acres (2.5 ha)
- Built: 1849
- Built by: Fielding Garr
- Architectural style: Double-Pen Type
- NRHP reference No.: 83004402
- Added to NRHP: January 21, 1983

The Fielding Garr Ranch is a ranch located on the southeastern portion of Antelope Island State Park in the Great Salt Lake, Utah, United States and is part of the Utah State Parks system. A 6.2 acres (2.5 ha) portion of the original ranch is listed on the National Register of Historic Places.

The Fielding Garr Ranch is located at Garr Springs, which is one of the strongest and most consistent springs of the 40 known springs on Antelope Island, though even this spring has shown some signs of drying up in recent years. The ranch is one of the oldest working ranching operations in the Western United States. The ranch was initially established in 1848, the year after the first Mormon pioneers came into the Salt Lake Valley. Fielding Garr, a widower with nine children, was sent by the Church of Jesus Christ of Latter-day Saints (LDS Church) to live on Antelope Island and establish a ranch to manage the church's Tithing Herds of cattle and sheep. The first building was an adobe house built in 1848 by pioneers of European descent and it is still in existence as the oldest building in Utah that still remains on its original foundation. The adobe ranch house was continuously inhabited thereafter until 1981 when the State of Utah prepared to set up Antelope Island as a Utah State Park. At various times other people tried to live on the island, but the harsh conditions, isolation and a lack of fresh water made it very difficult.

The ranch remained under the control of the LDS Church until 1870, when it was purchased by John Dooley. Dooley lived on the island and set up the Island Improvement Company to provide cattle and sheep ranching. At one point the island supported a population of 10,000 sheep and it was one of the largest sheep ranches in the United States. In 1893, John Dooley purchased William Glasmann’s entire Lake Point, Utah herd of 17 American bison and brought them to the island. Bison were nearing extinction over much of their historical range and he hoped that their novelty would add value to his ranch by charging people to hunt them.

Ranching continued until 1981, when Antelope Island State Park was established. The cattle and sheep were removed and the island park was created to protect the wildlife and allow park visitors to enjoy the scenery and to camp, boat and visit the beaches of the Great Salt Lake.

== Location ==
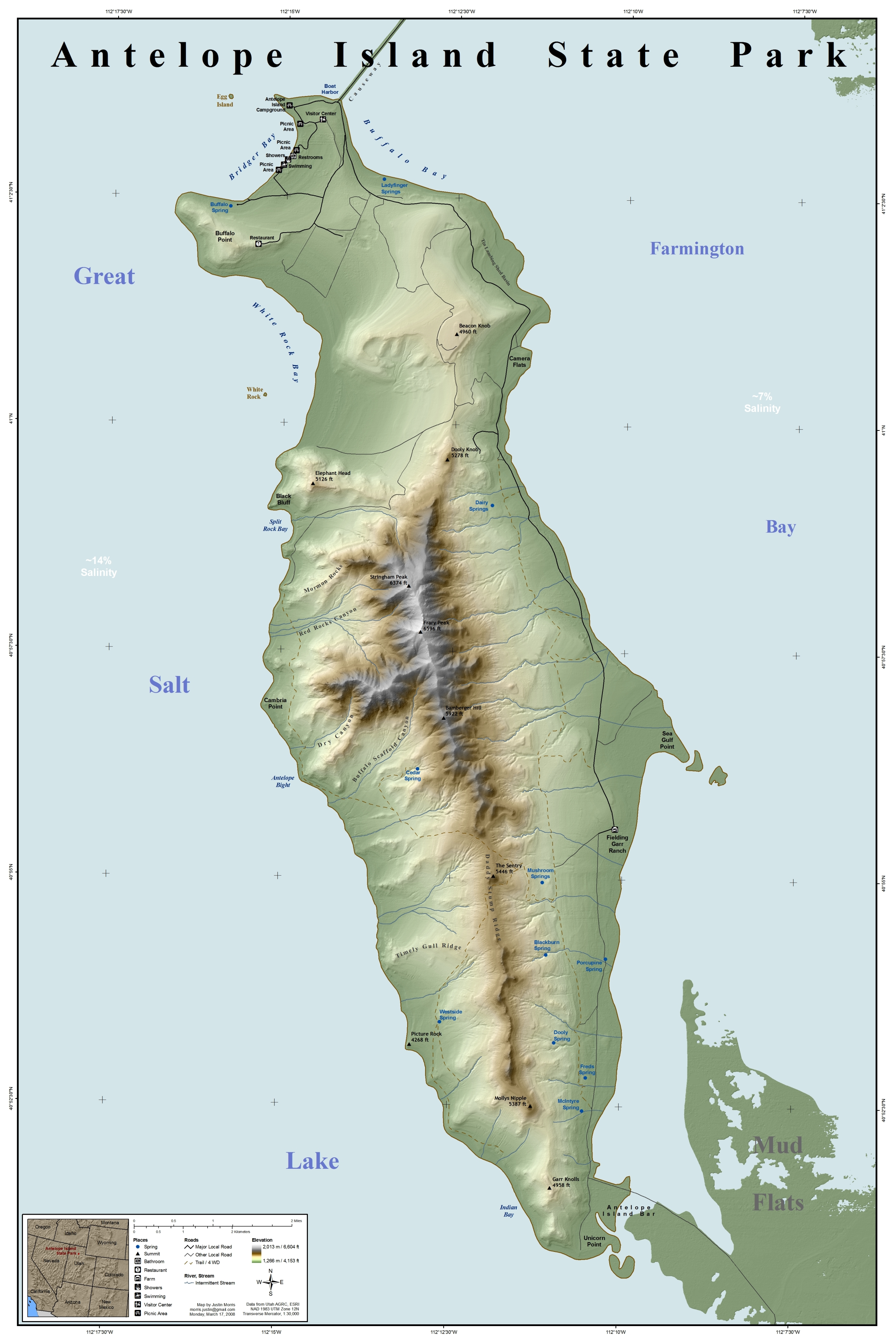
Map of Antelope Island

The ranch is on Antelope Island along the southeast portion of the island. Follow I-15 to Syracuse, Utah, 25 miles north of Salt Lake City. Take the Syracuse exit of I-15 (Exit 332) and go straight west 7 miles on Utah State Road 108 (Antelope Drive) to the Antelope Island State Park fee booth (at the beginning of the causeway). Continue straight along the causeway 6 miles to the island then take the left fork of the road, turning towards the south. In less than a half mile, at the second junction, bear to the left again, and travel south along this road about 11 miles to the ranch. There is a gate that controls the southern portion of the road. This gate and the ranch opens daily during the summer; it closes a bit earlier each day during the winter.

== Historic site ==
The Fielding Garr Ranch was listed on the National Register of Historic Places in 1983. The listing included four contributing buildings and one contributing structure on 6.2 acres (2.5 ha).

The ranch house was originally a double pen adobe building; there have been later additions. Outbuildings are a milk house, a blacksmith shop, and a spring house, and there is a rock stable structure.

== Activities ==
The Fielding Garr Ranch is part of Antelope Island State Park. Antelope Island is known for its scenic beauty, especially in the northwest quadrant of the island at Buffalo Point and White Rock Bay, where mountains and hills overlook beaches as well as the reflecting waters of the Great Salt Lake and other islands that are visible in the lake. A balloon festival is held yearly around Labor Day. Birdwatching on Antelope Island is well known. Trail running on the island has devotees, and several trail running races are held on the island each year at distances of 25 kilometers, 50 kilometers, 50 miles and 100 miles. Hiking and cycling are popular activities, but water is scarce and there are few trees on the island. Though not strictly a desert island there are no permanent human inhabitants and conditions are quite dry and can be very hot during the summer. Freely flowing fresh water is not readily available on the island, though there are a few natural springs, mostly in the mountainous spine of the island and towards the south end of the island, near the Fielding Garr Ranch. Water and restrooms are available in the visitor areas of the island. There is a giftshop and small fast food restaurant, on the northern end of the island, that is open during the main visitor season. It is located at Buffalo Point. Public beaches, a marina and overnight camping areas are available on the northern part of the island. Observing wildlife is also popular on Antelope Island, especially the large numbers of bison which are part of the Antelope Island bison herd. Coyotes and antelope are sometimes seen close to the main roads and campsites, and bison often wander across the roads, though the bison are most often found towards the south end of the island near the Fielding Garr Ranch.

Tours are available of the historical Fielding Garr Ranch and surrounding environs. Buildings include the adobe ranch house, silo, bunkhouse, stables, springhome, and blacksmith shop. The Fielding Garr Ranch is a demonstration ranch and visitors can get an idea of the lifestyle that was lived by ranch inhabitants in the past. The ranch area is one of the most popular bird watching locations on the island. Hiking and photography are also common. Horseback riding is available and horses can be rented at the ranch on an hourly basis.

== Habitat and wildlife ==
Antelope Island is mostly dry grassland. The eastern side of the island is a grassy plain or prairie habitat from the eastern shoreline to the central mountainous spine of the island. Few trees and little fresh water is present on the island, though there are a few small, sometimes inconsistent springs, especially in the areas near the Fielding Garr Ranch.

The trees surrounding the ranch, a small stream and pond, and an extensive marsh area, provide an isolated haven for birds along the east shore of the 15-mile-long sagebrush and grasslands covered Antelope Island.

There are approximately 250 species of water and shore birds, grassland birds and raptors that have been seen on Antelope Island, and many of them are found in the vicinity of the Fielding Garr Ranch. Some of these birds include northern waterthrush, American redstart, other warblers, vireos, great horned owls, long-eared owl, hermit thrush, Townsend's solitaire, loggerhead shrike (winter) varied thrush and northern shrike.

The Antelope Island bison herd is a herd of 500 to 700 American bison that is still present on the island and the herd is partly managed from the Fielding Garr Ranch. The bison may wander the entire island, but most tend to stay in the area around the ranch, since the habitat is excellent for them and more of the natural springs are in that part of the island. Other large mammals in the vicinity include coyotes, pronghorn, big horn sheep and mule deer.

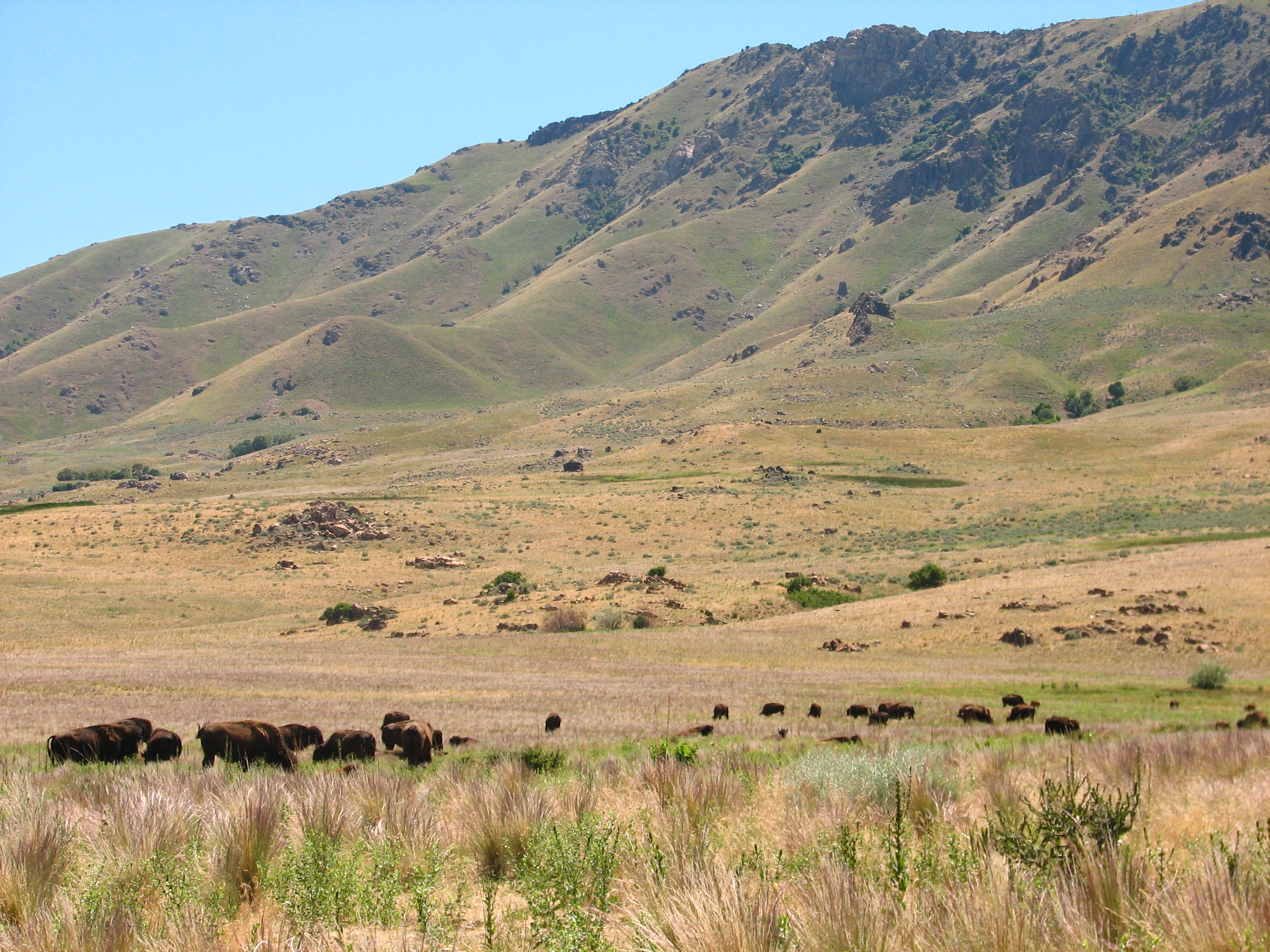
A herd of bison on Antelope Island

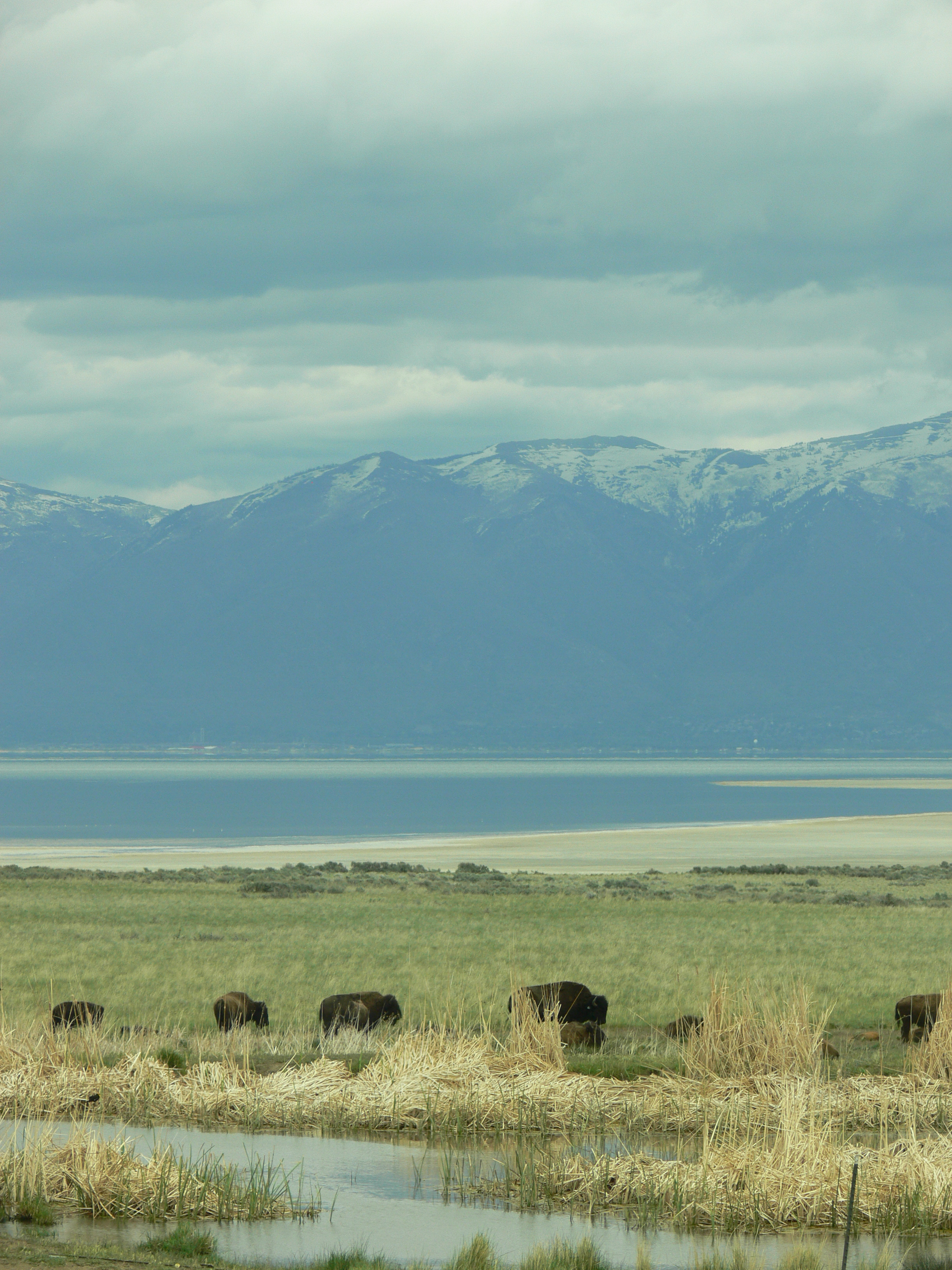
Bison near a freshwater spring on Antelope Island

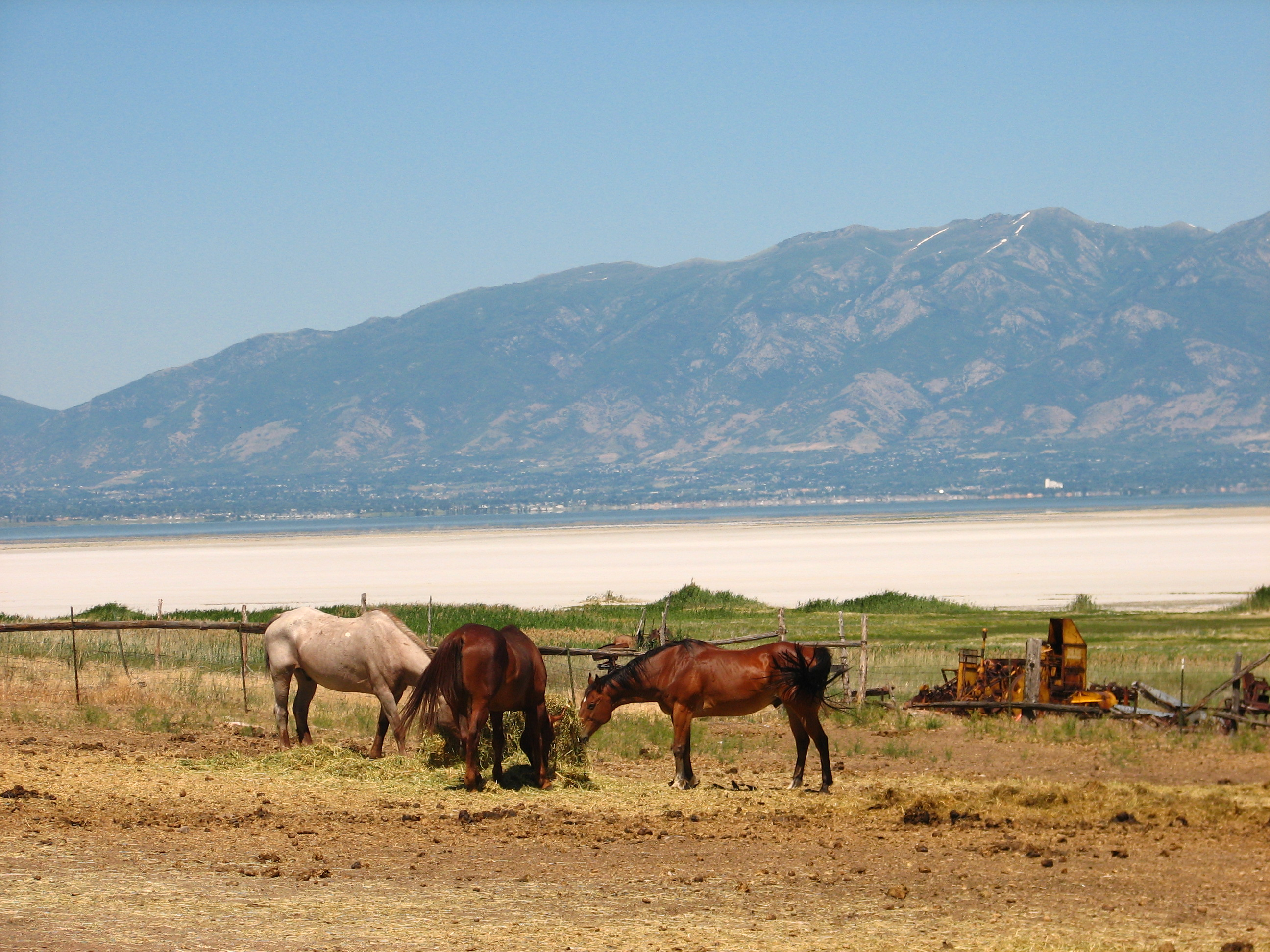
Fielding Garr Ranch on Antelope Island

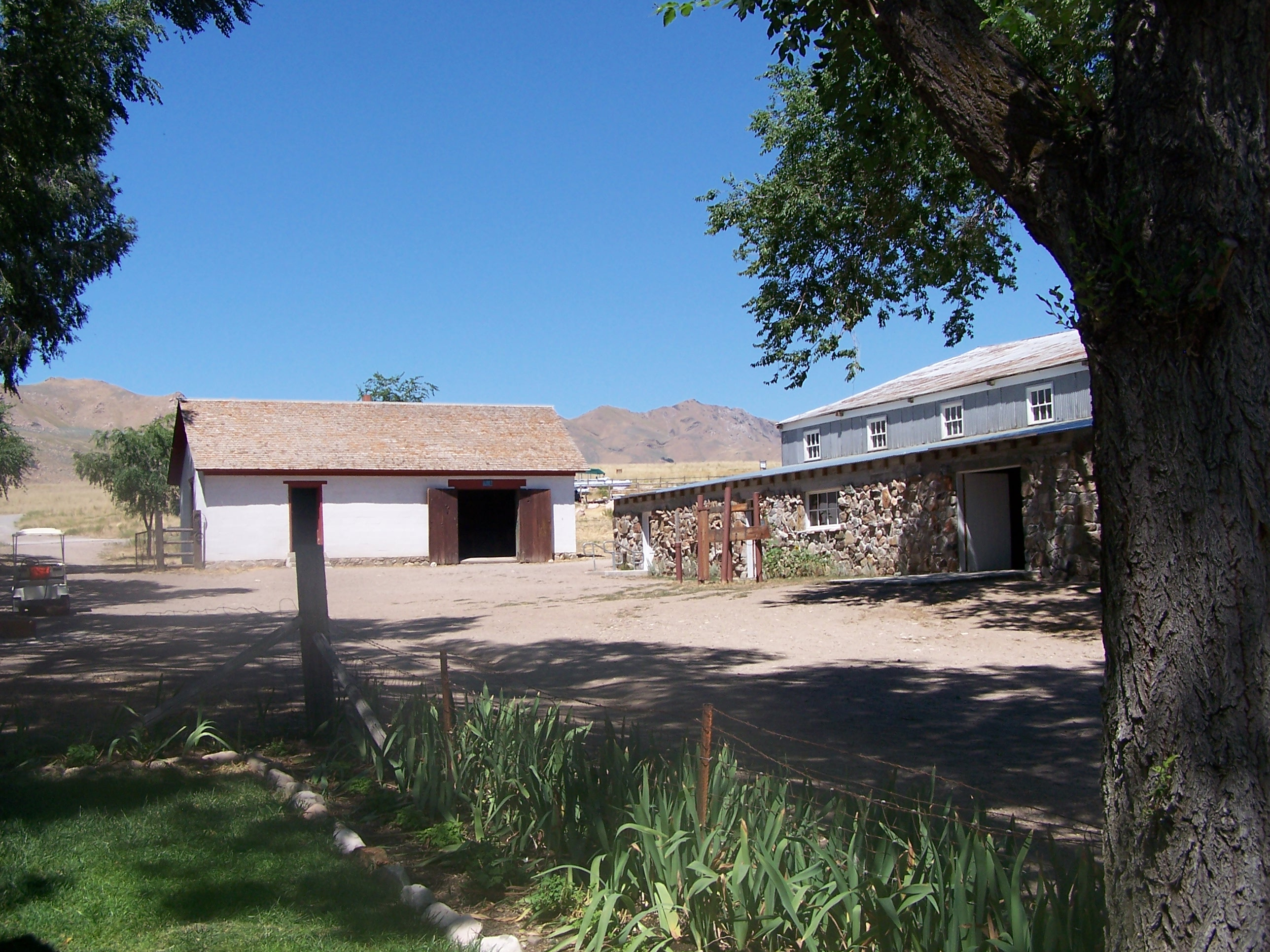
Antelope Island State Park Ranch

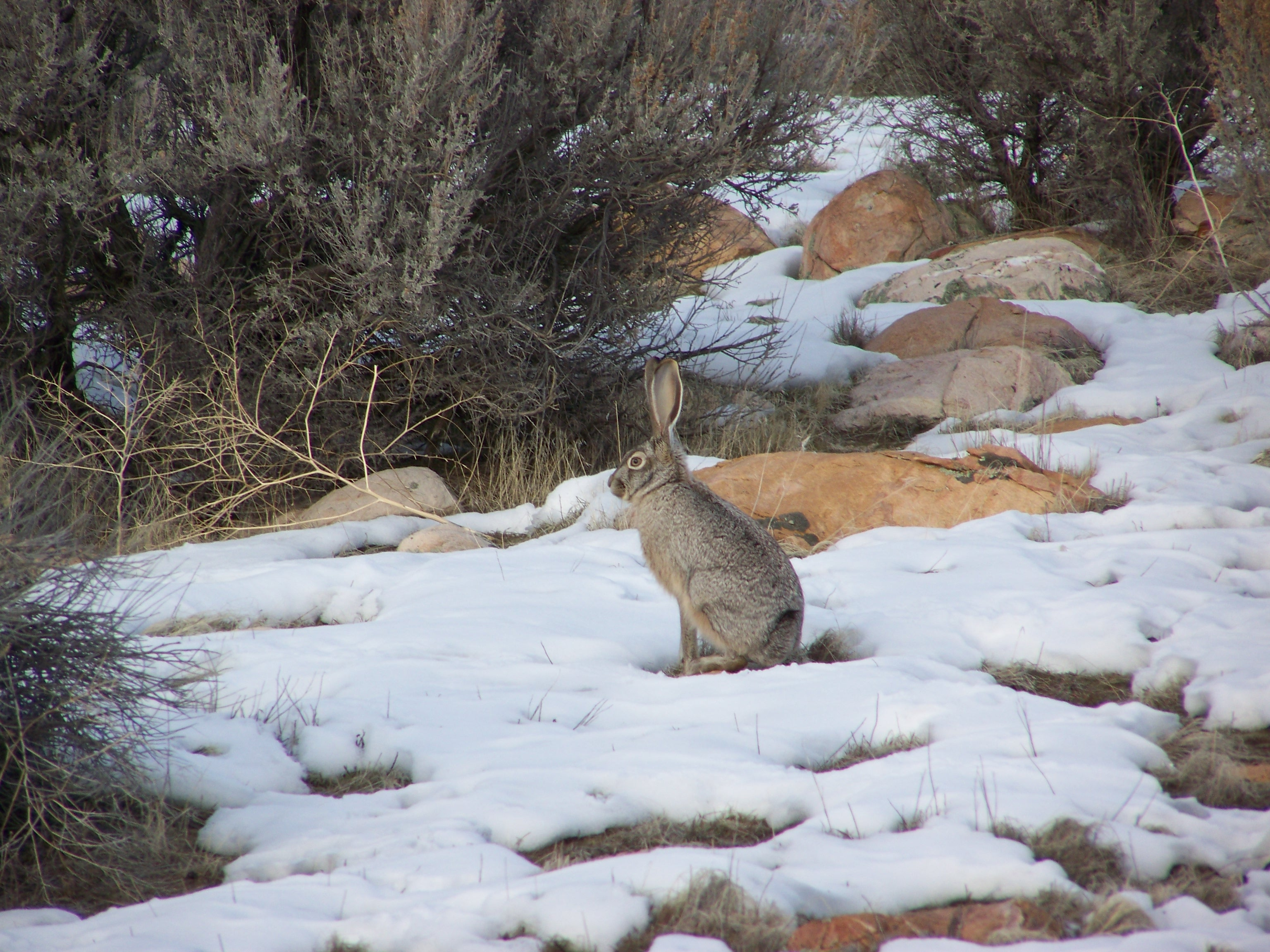
Jack rabbit in Antelope Island State Park

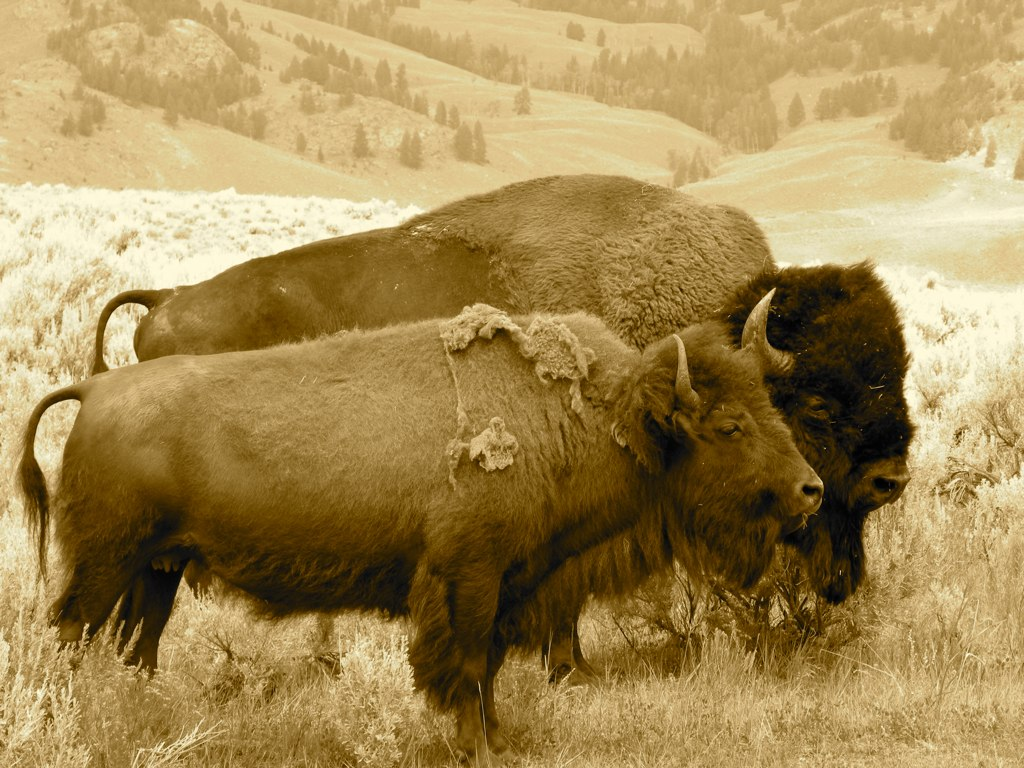
Bison pair

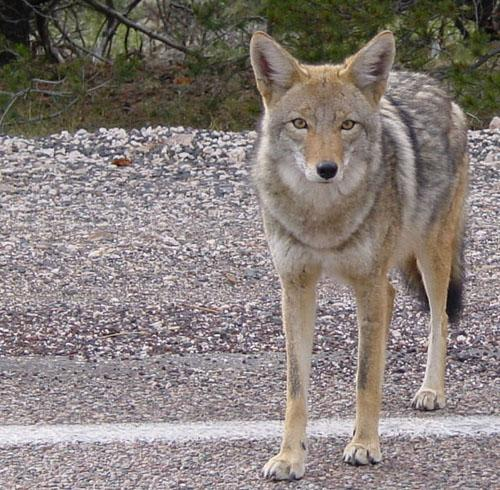
Coyote

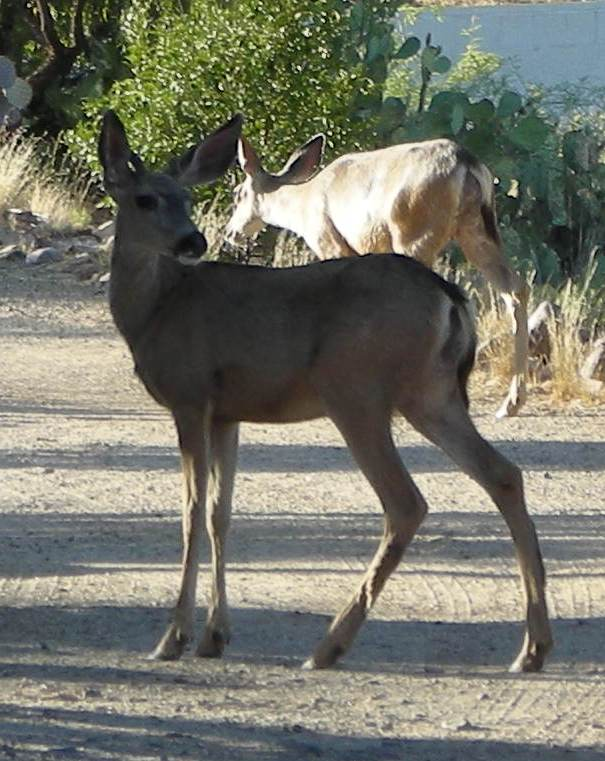
Mule deer

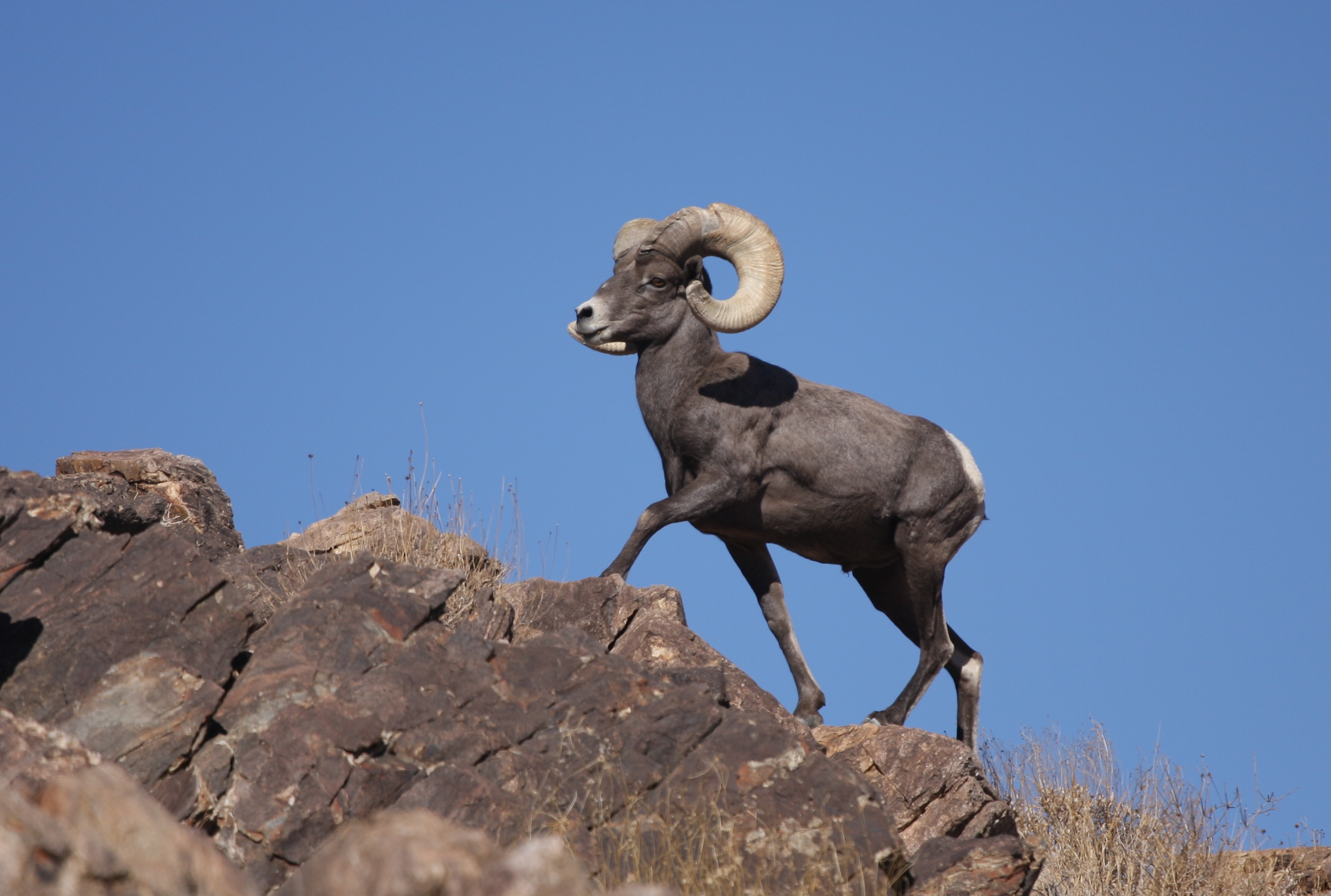
Bighorn sheep

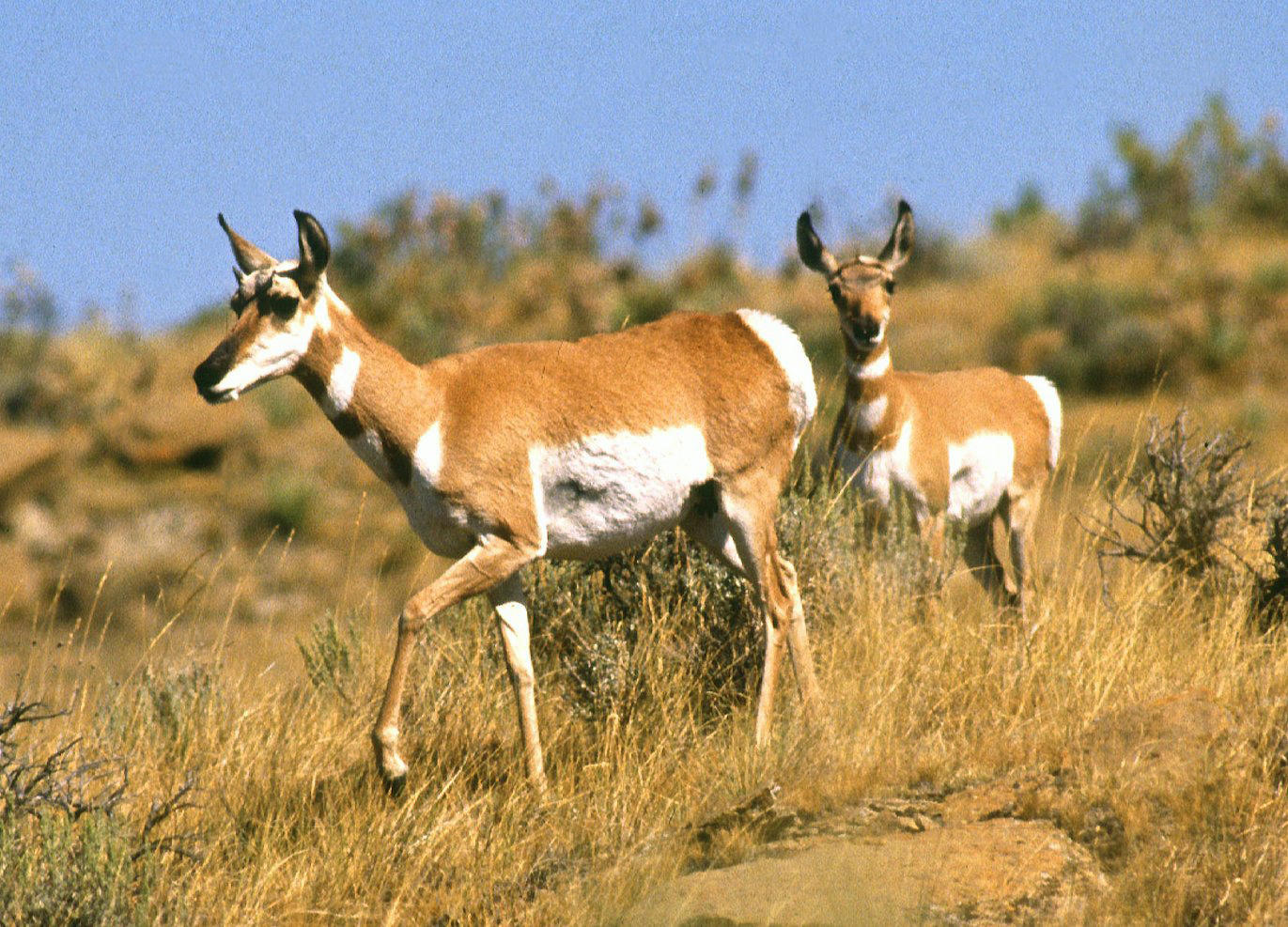
Pronghorn

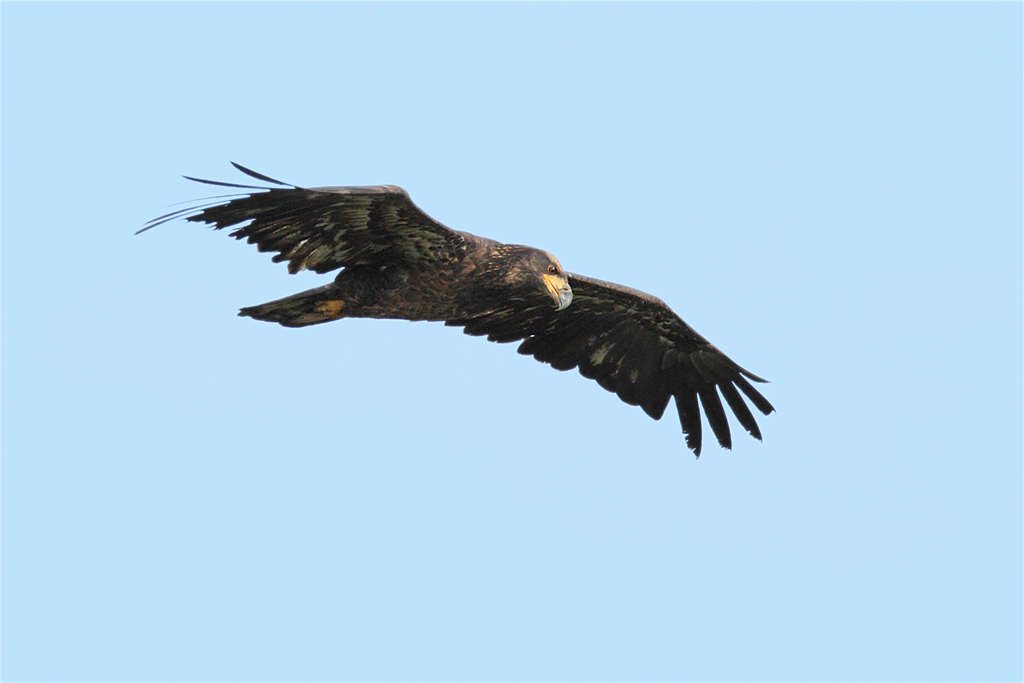
Juvenile bald eagle

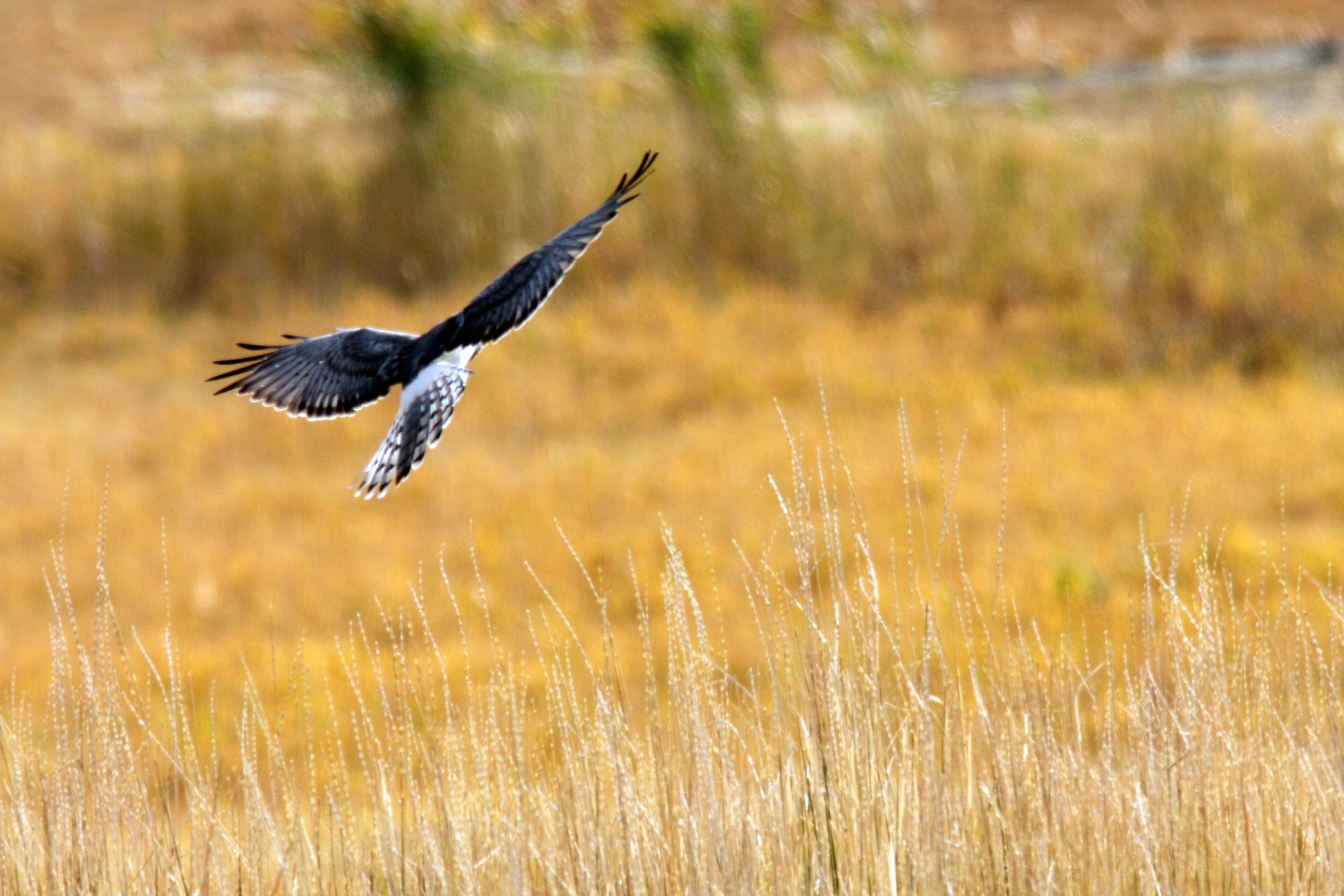
Circus hudsonius (northern harrier) male, on Antelope Island

== See also ==
- Antelope Island
- Antelope Island State Park
- Antelope Island Bison Herd
- Fremont Island
- Stansbury Island
- Bison hunting
- Bison
- European bison
- Henry Mountains Bison Herd
- Wisent
- Wood bison
- Yellowstone Park Bison Herd
