= Antelope Island bison herd =

Population of bison in Utah, USA

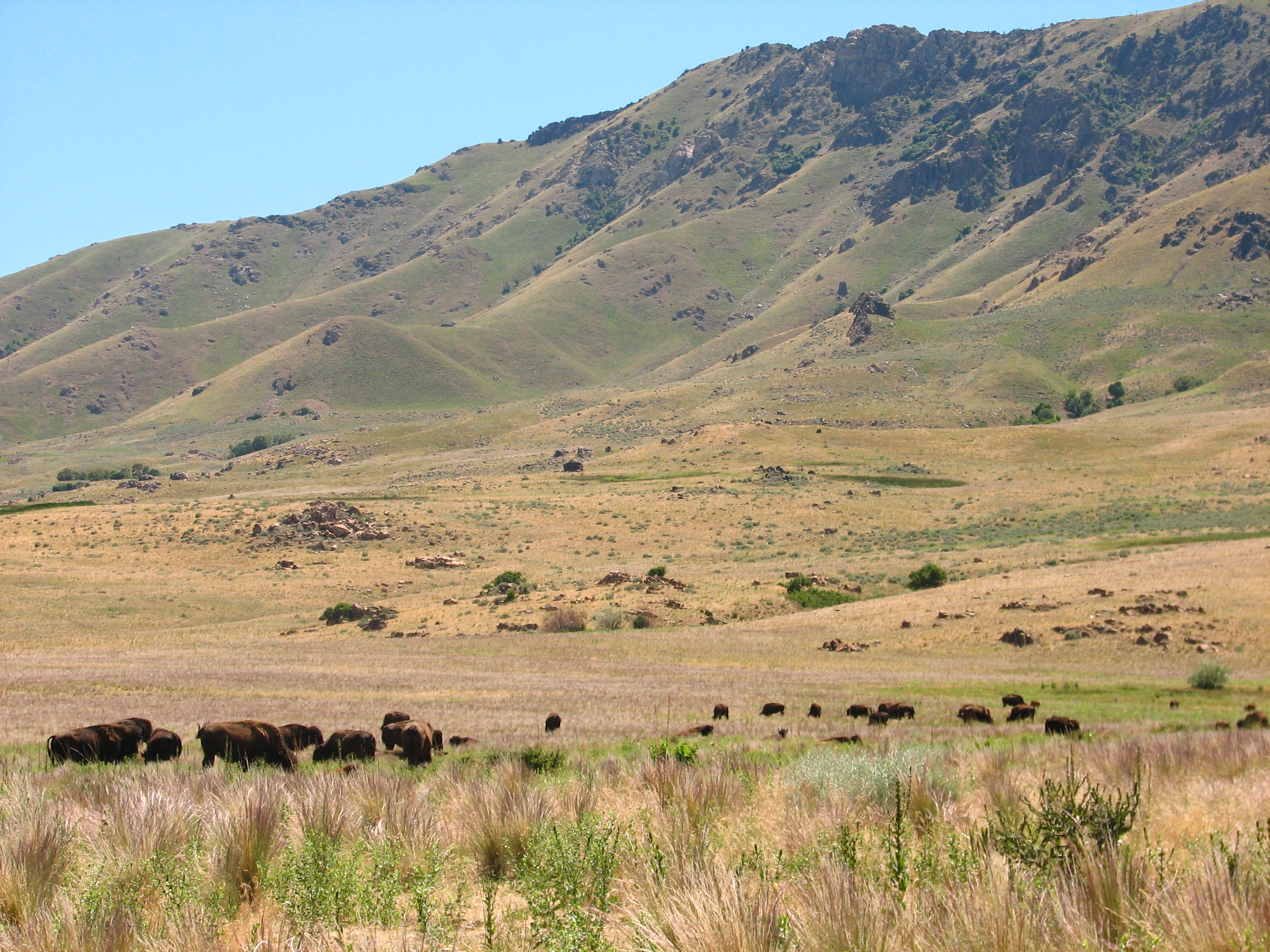
- Bison grazing on Antelope Island

- Location within Utah Location within the United States
- Location: Davis, Utah, United States
- Coordinates: 40°57′29″N 112°12′26″W
- Elevation: 4,350 ft (1,330 m)
- Established: 1893; state management since 1981
- Visitors: 280351 (in 2010)
- Governing body: Utah State Parks
- Website: Antelope Island State Park

The Antelope Island bison herd is a semi–free-ranging population of American bison (Bison bison, buffalo) in Antelope Island State Park in Great Salt Lake, Utah. Bison were introduced to Antelope Island in 1893. The herd is significant because it is one of the largest and oldest publicly owned bison herds in the nation. The Antelope Island bison herd currently numbers between 550 and 700 individuals. Though the bison on Antelope Island are plains bison (Bison bison bison), which was the most common bison subspecies in North America, the bison have a distinct genetic heritage from many of the other bison herds in the United States and they are considered to be desirable as part of the breeding and foundation stock for other bison herds, because of their separate genetic heritage and some of the distinct genetic markers that are found in the population.

The Antelope Island bison herd is one of the two bison herds managed by the State of Utah, the other being the Henry Mountains bison herd. Other large free-ranging, publicly controlled herds of bison in the United States include the Yellowstone Park bison herd (5,000 bison), the herd in Custer State Park, South Dakota (1,300 bison), the Henry Mountains bison herd in south-central Utah (300 to 500 animals), and the herd at Wind Cave National Park in South Dakota (350 bison).

Bison watching is one of the most popular activities on Antelope Island, and the bison generally are easily found and observed.

== Location and habitat ==
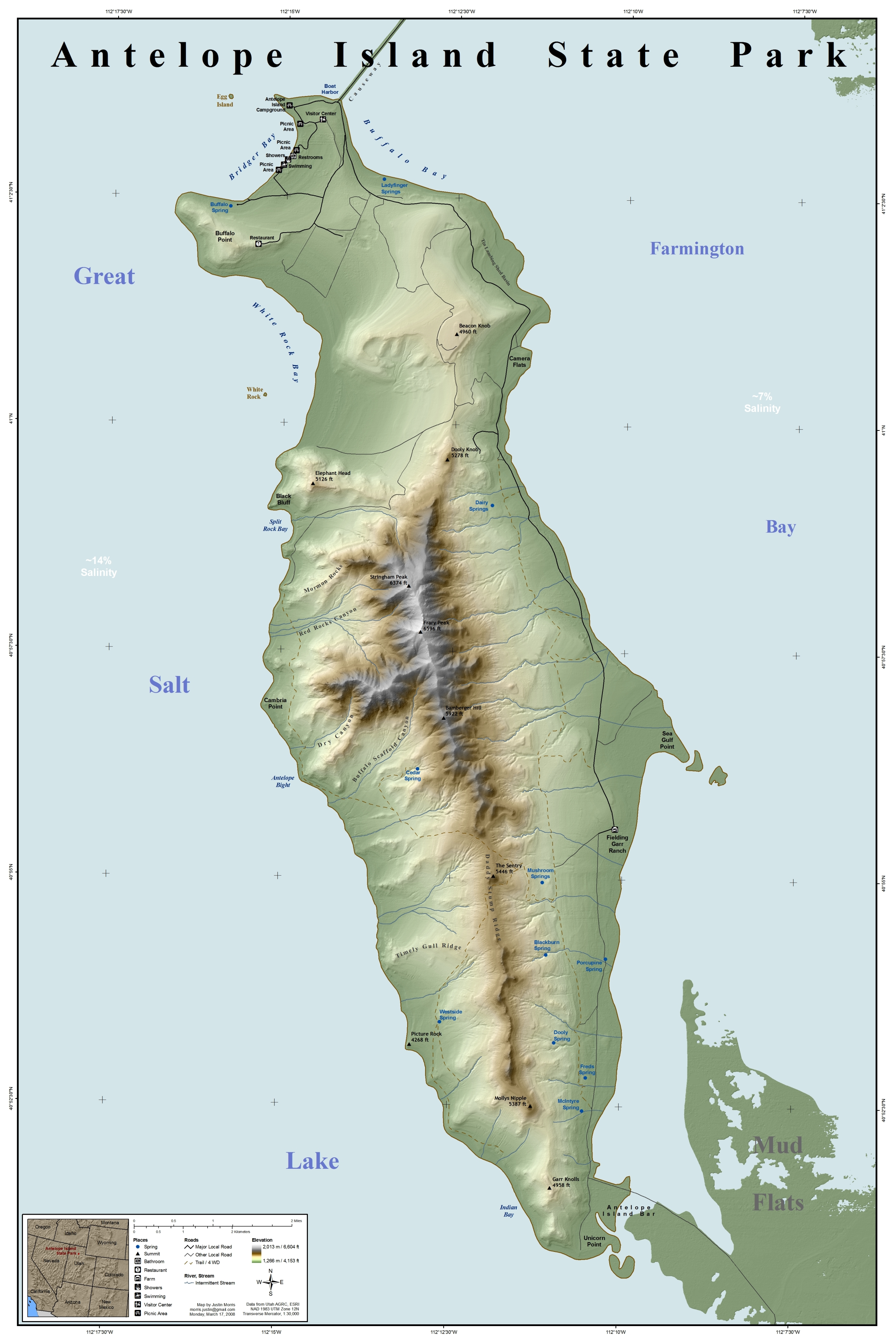
Map of Antelope Island

Bison occur almost anywhere on Antelope Island, including the northern end near the causeway, however most of them tend to congregate on the southeast side near the Fielding Garr Ranch.

American bison historically have lived in river valleys, and on prairies and plains. Typical habitat is open or semi-open grasslands, as well as sagebrush, semi-arid lands and scrublands. Some lightly wooded areas are also known historically to have supported bison. Bison will also graze in hilly or mountainous areas where the slopes are not steep. Though not commonly thought of as high altitude animals, bison in the Yellowstone Park bison herd are frequently found at elevations above 8,000 feet. Animals from the Henry Mountains bison herd are found on the plains around the Henry Mountains, Utah, as well as in mountain valleys of the Henry Mountains to an altitude of 10,000 feet. Bison historically lived in the high mountain "parks" of Colorado (e.g. South Park (Colorado basin)) which are at elevations of approximately 10,000 feet. The Denver Museum of Nature and Science includes a diorama depicting bison in this setting and the original specimen was collected from Lost Park, Colorado, in 1887.

There are no river valleys on Antelope Island, though there are some springs and some relatively flat to gently sloping plains, rising into mountains along the central spine of the island. Antelope Island sits at an elevation of approximately 4,300 feet above sea level with peaks to 6,500 feet. This is similar to the high plains of Colorado and Wyoming. Though bison in the park will wander over most of this range, they tend to stay more in the lower and flatter grassy areas of the Antelope Island State Park.

== History ==
The Antelope Island American bison heard began with an entrepreneurial venture by a man named William Glasmann. In 1889, he and a Mr. John Lynch purchased the Jeter Clinton Property on Clinton Landing Road in Lake Point, Utah. The property contained the historic Jeter Clinton home and the now destroyed Lake House Hotel, which saw its hay day in 1870s during a historic lake level high point for the Great Salt Lake, but had since fallen into decline as the lake receded and the newer Garfield Resort was built on the water just 1.5 miles east down the shoreline.

In the same year of this land acquisition, Glasmann had visited Texas and met Charles Jesse “Buffalo” Jones of Kansas. He put a down payment on acquiring a portion of the Jones American bison herd and offered for him to manage what Glasmann called his Utah Buffalo Zoological Gardens. The first American bison arrived in Lake Point in October 1889 in a starved and weak state from Manitoba. In less than a year, Glasmann’s herd grew to seventeen.

The acquired Clinton land and the buffalo were part of a real estate scheme to sell subdivided cottage lots with beautiful planted trees, gardens, and culinary water wells with the tourist attraction of a Buffalo Park. The venture was unsuccessful and on February 18, 1893, Glasmann’s Buffalo Park Land Company sold its seventeen American bison to John E. Dooley. The bison were herded around the lake up to Farmington, loaded on a flat boat, and taken to Antelope Island.

At the time of the arrival of early European explorers and pioneers, there were no bison on the island as they had become extinct over much of their range by the late 19th century. Mr. Dooley brought the American bison to Antelope Island in hopes of sustaining a herd that could be hunted. Bison hunting started in 1896 and by the early 20th century, several hundred bison were present on the island. The herd was managed from the Fielding Garr Ranch on the east side of the island.

The Bison Herd in Lake Point

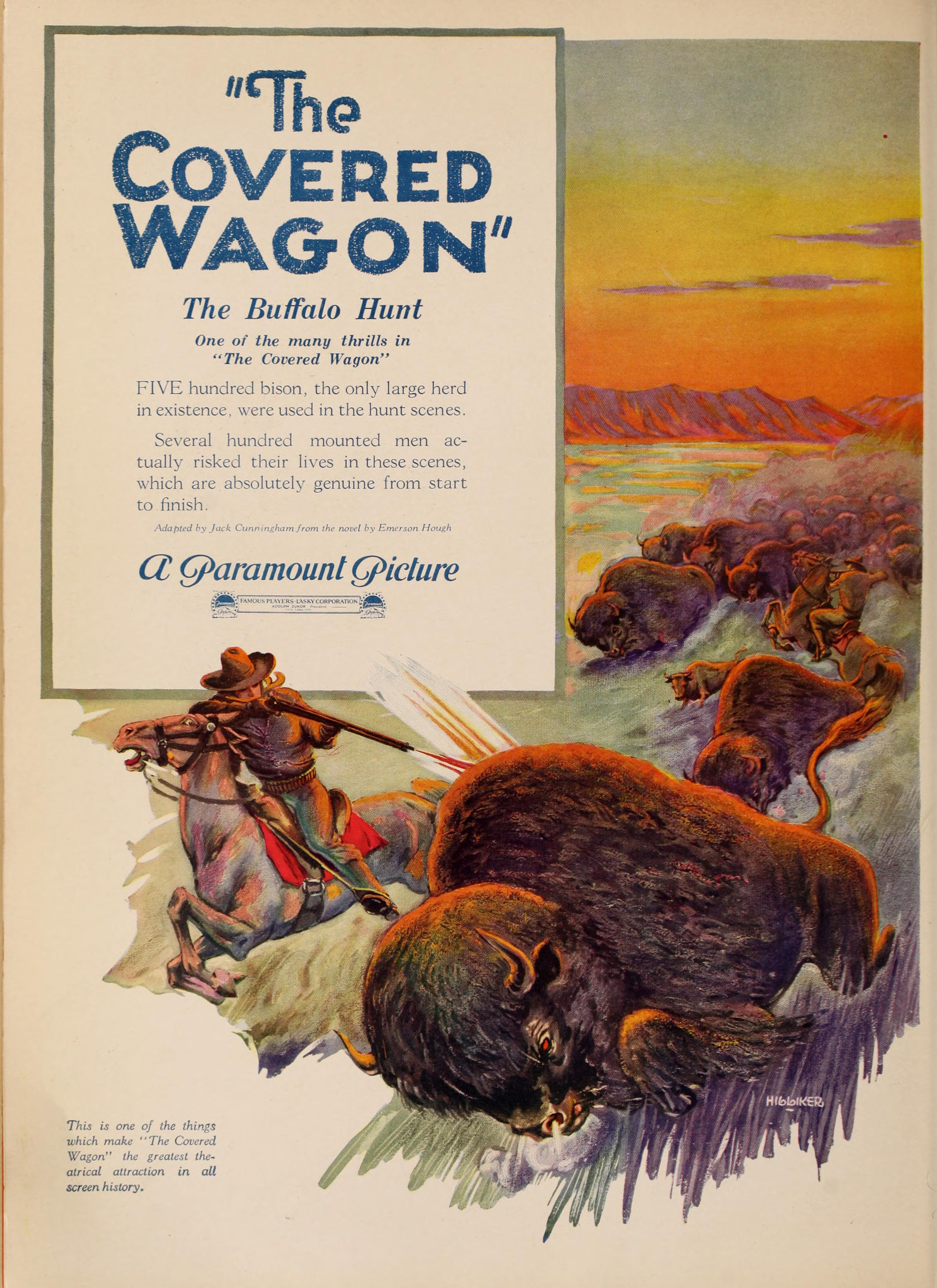
The Covered Wagon

The herd appeared in the film The Covered Wagon in 1923. The silent movie was filmed on Antelope Island for a scene requiring a buffalo hunt and a stampede. At the time the herd on Antelope Island was possibly the largest herd of bison in the United States. After much effort, about 350 of the animals were herded into a stampede to be filmed. The movie is considered by some people to be the first great Western epic and it established some of the clichés that persist in Western movies, such as circling the wagons in time of danger or attacks. During the movie, seven buffalo were shot and killed for the hunting scenes. "Don't grow sentimental over the seven," said James Cruze, the director of the film. "The folks out there would like to get rid of the whole herd and they would, but for the sentimental hubbub that is always raised when they talk of rounding out the buffalo. The animals are worthless - there isn't worse meat on earth to eat - and they ruin the whole territory for cattle grazing purposes. So the buffalo remain - sentimental reminders of the America of the past."

Dooley sold the herd to A. H. Leonard in 1924. Leonard intended to sell the bison to zoos, but was not able to corral them. He next tried to offer the island and the bison to the United States Department of the Interior. Leonard had hoped that a national park would be established on the island therefore preserving the herd. Time magazine cites "Congressional apathy" for the lack of a land transfer. Leonard was once again forced to change his business plan. This time he wanted to expand the cattle ranching on the island and to do this the number of bison needed to be reduced. Leonard announced that a hunt would be held in the fall of 1926. The hunt took place in November, but not without protests from around the nation. The New York World and other newspapers of the day tried to arouse public sentiment against the hunt. Utah governor George Dern received formal protests of the hunt from the American Humane Society, Massachusetts governor Alvan T. Fuller and Boston mayor Malcolm Nichols. Governor Dern declined to prevent the hunt, stating "Antelope Island and the buffalo herd are privately owned." The hunt took place with noted participants Ralph and Edward Ammerman of Scranton, Pennsylvania, and big game hunter J. O. Beebe of Omaha, Nebraska.

The hunt of 1926 was covered by Time magazine. A herd of approximately 300-400 bison was culled to about 50 by a large group of hunters on horseback with modern rifles. Thereafter, public sentiment changed and activists began to call for the protection of the herd on the island. Bison hunting was scaled down.

The Antelope Island bison herd and the island remained in private hands until 1969 when the northern 2,000 acres (810 ha) of the island were purchased by the State of Utah. In 1981, the State of Utah purchased the Fielding Garr Ranch and the rest of the island, including ownership of the herd which was once again numbering in the hundreds. Since that time, hunting has been restricted to only a few animals per year and the bison have been carefully managed and monitored for health and absence of disease.

Every year, in late October, all the bison are herded towards a central area in the Great Buffalo Roundup and sent briefly into pens where they are examined, weighed and vaccinated and decisions made on culling and selecting breeding stock. The majority of the bison are then turned loose within a few days and allowed to roam free the rest of the year.

The Antelope Island bison herd fluctuates between 550 and 700, and is one of the largest publicly owned bison herds in the nation. The reason for the variability of the size of the herd is that approximately 150 to 200 calves are born every year, and since this is prime prairie habitat for bison, with no significant predators, the herd can increase by up to twenty-five percent every year. It is felt that 700 is near the maximum preferred carrying capacity for bison on the island, so the excess bison are culled and removed. Bison from Antelope Island are often sent to other herds around North America because of their genetic isolation, some unique genetic markers contained in the population, and because of their disease-free condition. Some are also purchased at the pen site in a yearly public auction and are taken as meat or breeding stock for commercial buffalo farms in other parts of the world. "Though some resent the notion of corralling a wild beast like the bison for what amounts to a physical, most understand that the state means to protect the herd."

== Ecology ==
Antelope Island has large areas of dry grass prairie and this provides a nearly optimum environment for bison. Other mammals found on the island include coyotes, bobcats, mule deer (estimated to number 250), pronghorn antelope (approximately 200 on the island), and bighorn sheep (estimated 200). Bald eagles, Golden eagles and various large hawks and falcons are also found on Antelope Island.

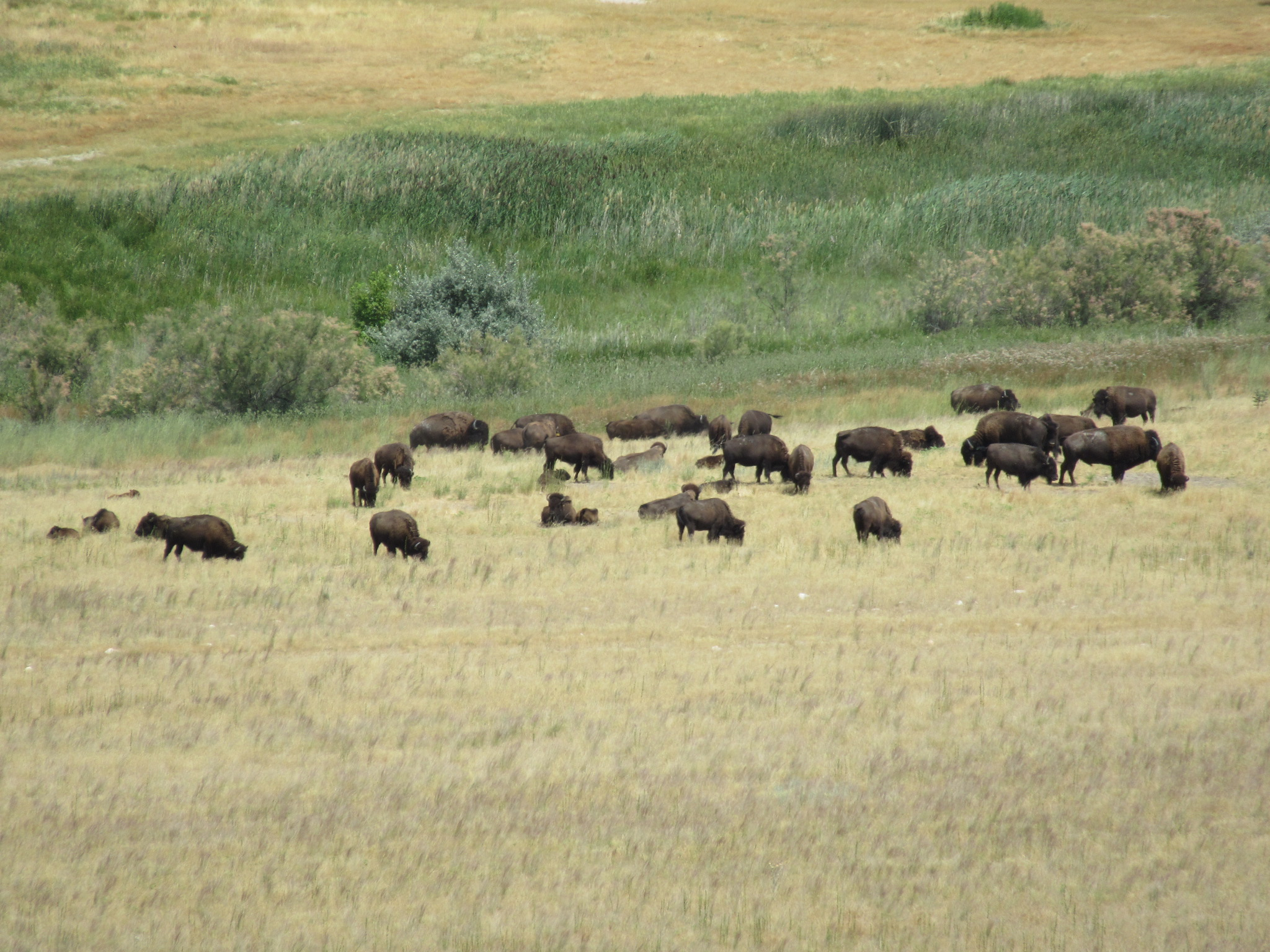
A herd of bison on Antelope Island

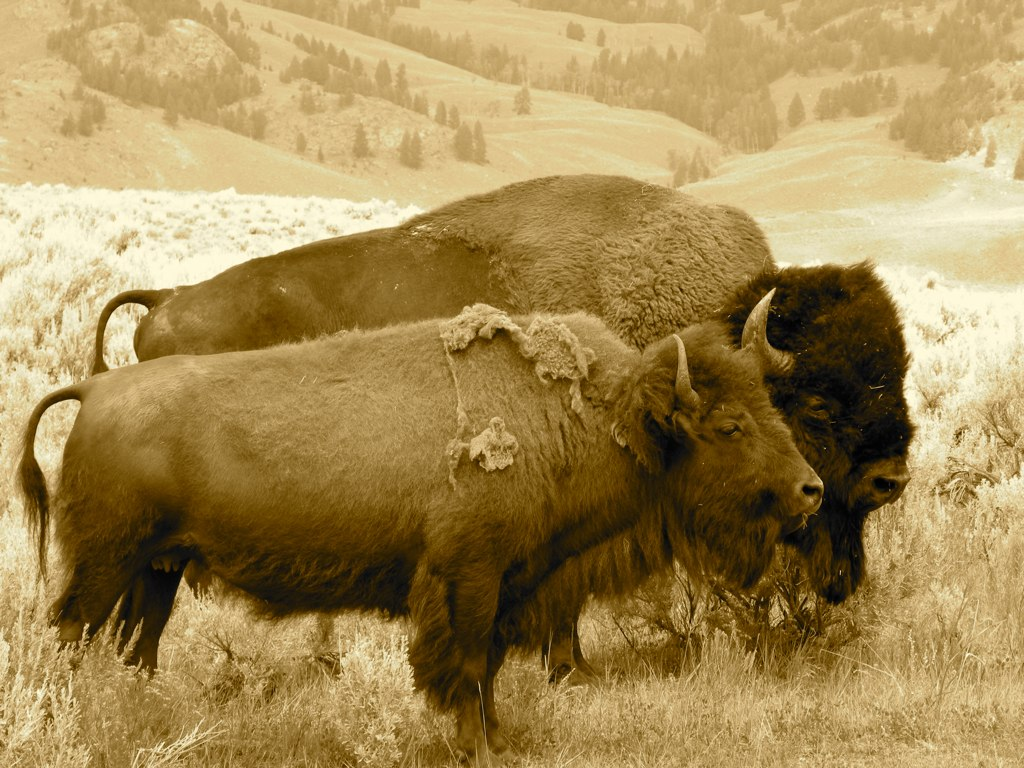
Bison pair

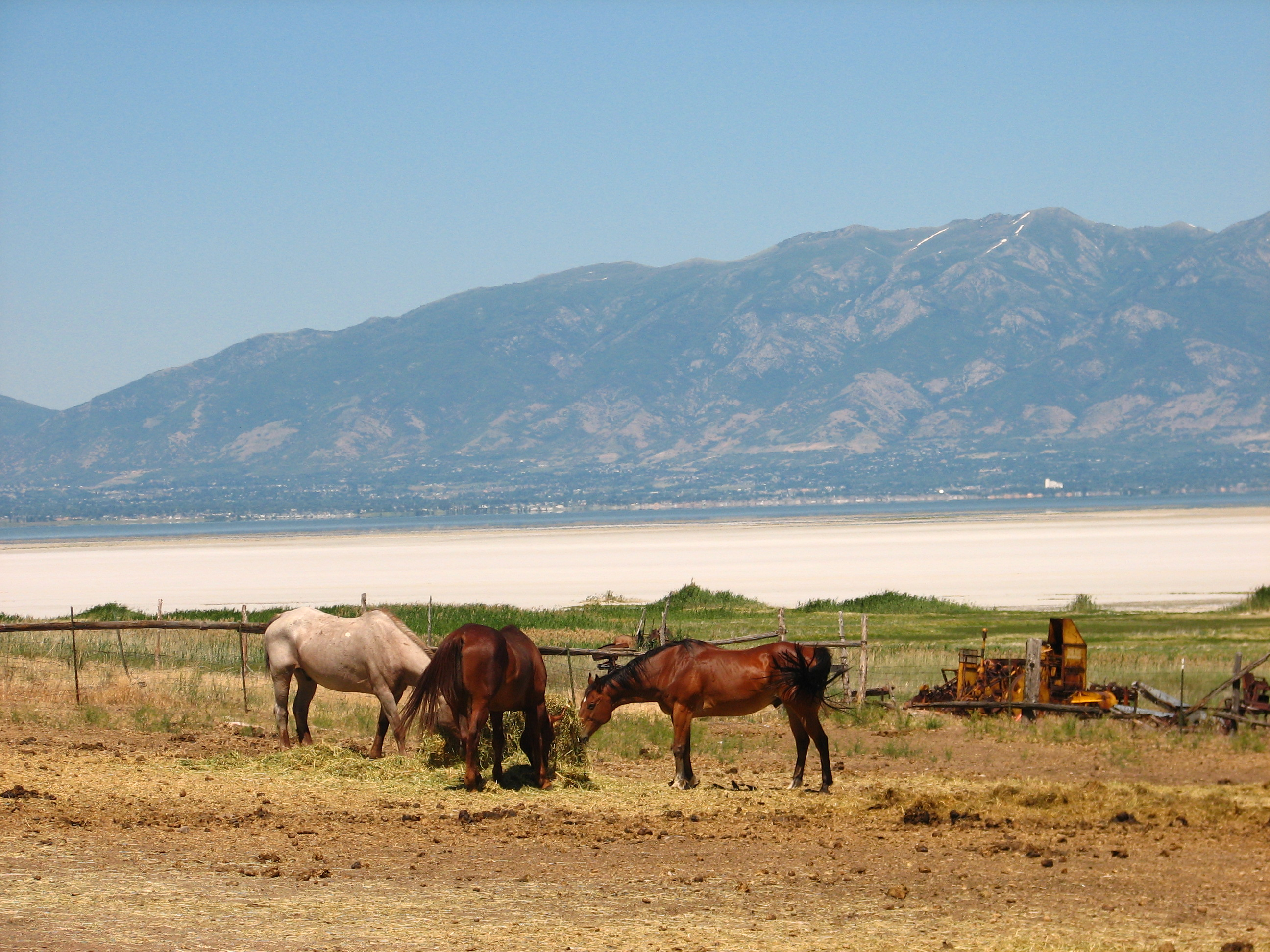
Fielding Garr Ranch on Antelope Island

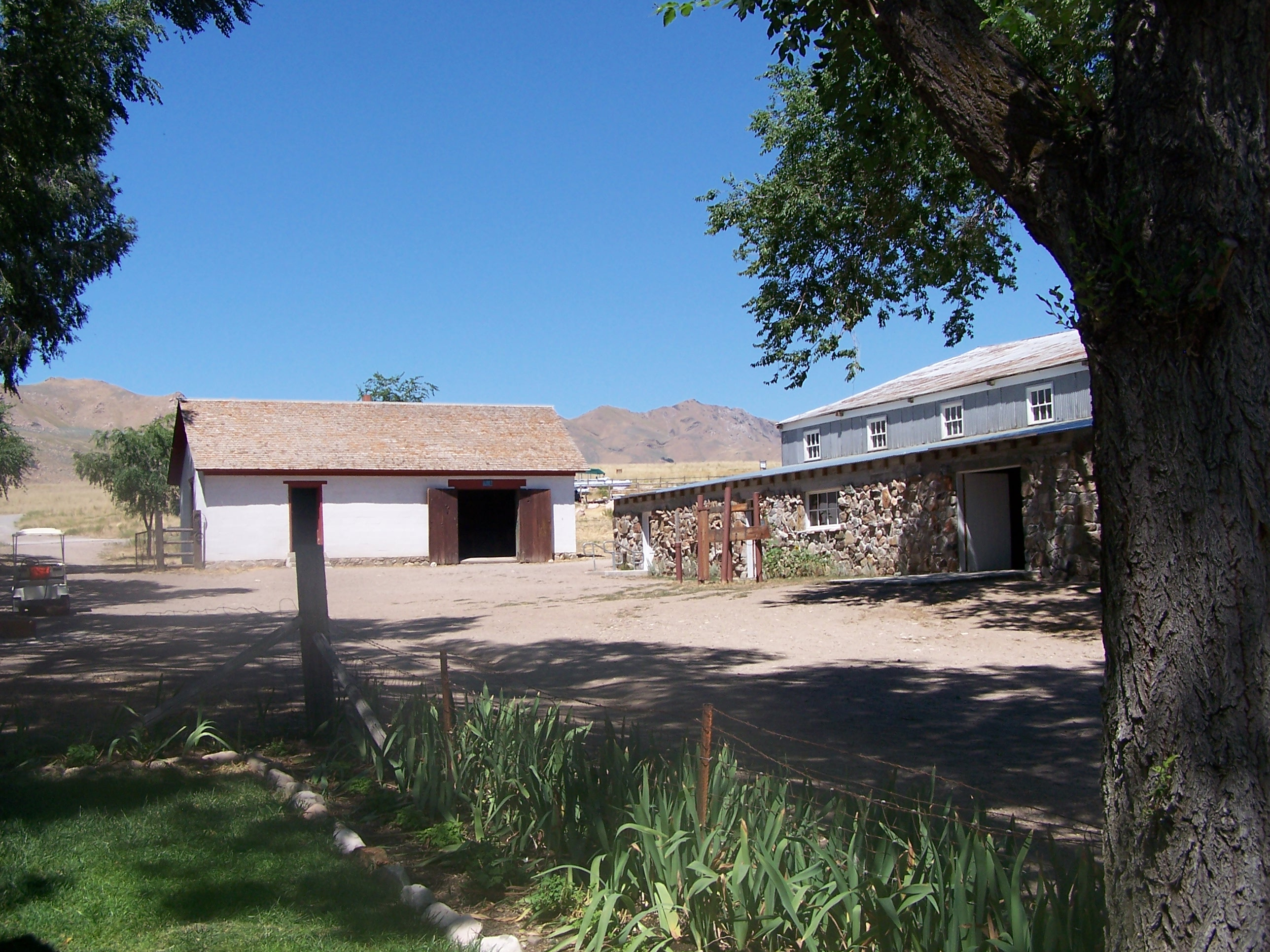
Antelope Island State Park, Fielding Garr Ranch

== Genetics ==
The Antelope Island bison herd was considered to be genetically pure in the past, since there were no known attempts at hybridization between these bison and cattle, but recent genetic studies have called this into question. Officially, the "American Buffalo" is classified by the United States Government as a type of cattle, and the government allows private herds to be managed as such. This is a reflection of the characteristics that bison share with cattle. Though the American bison (Bison bison) is not only a separate species, but actually in a separate genus from domestic cattle (Bos primigenius), they clearly have a lot of genetic compatibility and American bison can interbreed freely with cattle. Moreover, when they do interbreed, the crossbreeds tend to look very much like purebred bison, so appearance is completely unreliable as a means of determining what is a purebred bison and what is a crossbred cow. Many ranchers have deliberately cross bred their cattle with bison, and it would also be expected that there could be some natural hybridization in areas where cattle and bison occur in the same range. Since cattle and bison eat similar food and tolerate similar conditions, they have often been in the same range together in the past, and opportunity for cross breeding may sometimes have been common.

In recent decades tests were developed to determine the source of mitochondrial DNA in cattle and bison, and it was found that most private 'buffalo' herds were actually cross bred with cattle, and even most state and federal buffalo herds had some cattle DNA. With the advent of nuclear microsatellite DNA testing, the number of herds identified as containing cattle genes has increased. Though approximately 500,000 bison exist on private ranches and in public herds, some people estimate that perhaps only 15,000 to 25,000 of these bison are pure and are not actually bison-cattle hybrids. "DNA from domestic cattle (Bos taurus) has been detected in nearly all bison herds examined to date."

A landmark study of bison genetics that was performed by James Derr of the Texas A&M University corroborated this. The Derr study was undertaken in an attempt to determine what genetic problems bison might face as they repopulate former areas, and it noted that bison seem to be doing quite well, despite their apparent genetic bottleneck. One possible explanation for this might be the small amount of domestic cattle genes that are now in most bison populations, though this isn't the only possible explanation for bison success.

In the study cattle genes were also found in small amounts throughout most herds. "The hybridization experiments conducted by some of the owners of the five foundation herds of the late 1800s, have left a legacy of a small amount of cattle genetics in many of our existing bison herds." He also said, "All of the state owned bison herds tested (except for possibly one) contain animals with domestic cattle mtDNA." It appears that the one state herd that had no cattle genes was the Henry Mountains bison herd in the Henry Mountains of Utah. It was founded with bison from the Yellowstone Park bison herd. However, the extension of this herd into the Book Cliffs of Central Utah involved mixing the founders with additional bison from another source, so it is not known if the Book Cliffs extension of the herd is also free of cattle hybridization.

Genetic studies seem to show that the number of cattle genes in the bison on Antelope Island is very limited. In the future, it may be discovered that almost all bison have some genetic inheritance from domestic cattle, but this does not mean that they are not bison, especially if the cattle genetic contribution is very small. In some senses, this would be analogous to recent findings that many, if not most wild wolves have some domestic dog genes. An example is a study published in the journal 'Science' that indicate that wolves with black coats have generally inherited that gene as a result of ancient wolf-dog hybridization. Hybridization can often be a beneficial genetic event in a population, as indicated by the concept of hybrid vigor, but when a population or species is well suited to its environment there is also the possibility that hybridization could make them less fit. In a study done on bison populations where some of the individual bison had cattle mitochondria, it was found that those individuals with cattle mitochondrial genes were consistently smaller than other bison in the same population that had only bison mitochondria.

A separate study by Wilson and Strobeck, published in the journal Genome, was done to define the relationships between different herds of bison in the United States and Canada, and to determine whether the bison at Wood Buffalo National Park in Canada and the Yellowstone Park bison herd were possibly separate subspecies, and not plains bison. It was determined that the Wood Buffalo Park bison were actually cross breeds between plains Bison and Wood Bison, but that their predominant genetic makeup was truly that of the expected "Wood Buffalo" (Bison bison athabascae). The Yellowstone Park bison herd were plains bison (Bison bison bison). The bison in the Antelope Island herd appeared to be more distantly related to other plains bison than any other plains bison group that was tested, though this might be due to genetic drift caused by the small size of only 12 individuals in the founder population. A side finding of this was that the Antelope Island bison herd is most closely related to the Wood Buffalo National Park bison herd, though the Antelope Island bison are actually plains bison.

== Future ==
The carrying capacity of Antelope Island for bison is not known with certainty. It is estimated that perhaps 700 individual bison could live on the island without significantly degrading the environment or adversely affecting other species. The future breeding and genetic maintenance of bison on the island remains under discussion. The management of the Antelope Island bison herd as part of the national strategy to return wild bison to more of their previous historical range also remains under development.

Bison culling and hunting of the Antelope Island bison herd has resulted in some public controversy, and some groups are working to change this policy. Proposals include ending all culling and hunting, ending sales of bison at the annual auction, and moving bison off the island to a natural habitat where they could live without interference. Most wildlife managers feel this is currently unfeasible, saying that without culling they would soon overpopulate the island, causing ecological damage and would then undergo a population crash from disease and starvation. They also claim there is not enough large tracts of open range and natural habitat available to move bison. Currently, some state and national parks have habitat for bison, but most of these already have bison present. If the bison were moved, special management would be required to maintain their genetic diversity. Most specialists in population biology feel it is not generally desirable to merge significant numbers of transplanted individuals with a large, already existing herd or population, such as the Yellowstone Park bison herd since those herds are probably already at or near their carrying capacity. Introduction of more animals, from Antelope Island, might result in the deaths of an equal number of already existent bison; it is expected they would displace already-present inhabitants since current ranges are generally close to carrying capacity. Without special management, merging the Antelope island bison with another herd might also cause introduction of domestic cattle genes into herds where such genes are not currently present.
