= Wind Cave bison herd =

American bison in Wind Cave National Park, South Dakota

Coordinates: 43.5776°N 103.475°W

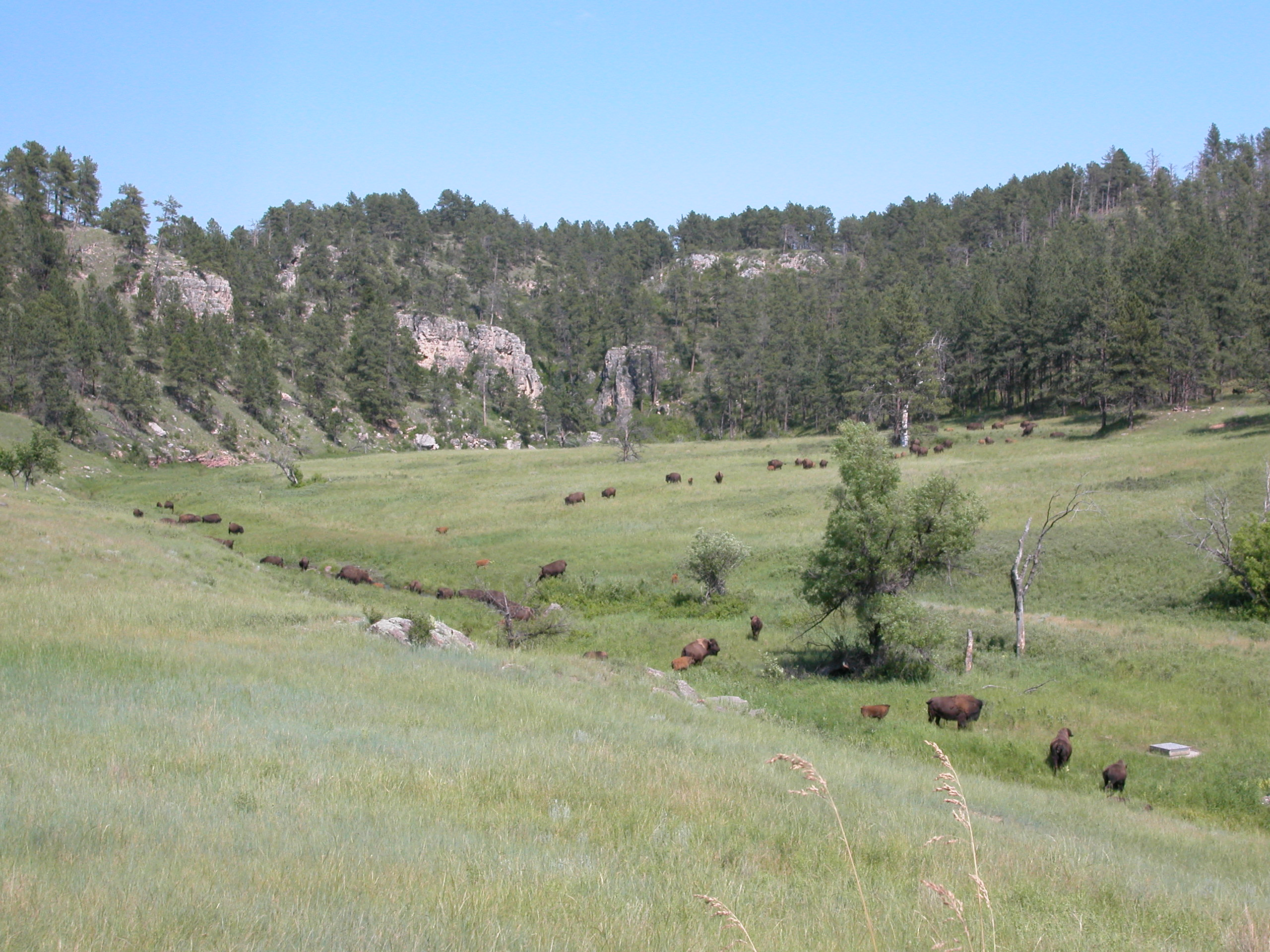
Part of the Wind Cave bison herd (2003)

The Wind Cave bison herd is a herd of 250–400 American bison in Wind Cave National Park, South Dakota, United States. As an active participant in the conservation of American bison, it is believed to be one of only seven free-roaming and genetically pure herds on public lands in North America. The other six herds are in Yellowstone Park, Theodore Roosevelt National Park (North Dakota), Henry Mountains (Central Utah), Blue Mounds State Park (Minnesota), Minneopa State Park (Minnesota), and Elk Island National Park (Alberta, Canada). The Wind Cave herd are of the Plains bison subspecies (Bison bison bison).

== History ==
The American bison (Bison bison) once numbered in the millions, perhaps between 25 million and 60 million by some estimates, and they were possibly the most numerous large land animal on earth. However, they were hunted to near extinction throughout North America by the late 1880s. The Wind Cave bison herd was started with 14 bison from the New York Zoological Society and with six animals from the Yellowstone Park bison herd. In addition, in the 1960s, a bull bison was received from Theodore Roosevelt National Park. The Yellowstone Park bison herd was the last free-ranging bison herd in the United States and the only place where they did not go locally extinct, so they have become part of the foundation stock for many other herds. The Wind Cave population has served as the foundation stock for the Tallgrass Prairie bison herd in Kansas. The National Park Service is working with The Nature Conservancy to establish additional satellite herds with the goal of having a total population of at least 1,000 breeding bison of Wind Cave lineage.

== Ecology ==
Wind Cave National Park has large areas of grassland prairie and this provides a nearly optimum environment for American bison.

Bison are large herd animals that defend their young vigorously. American bison can run up to 35 miles (56 km) per hour and are surprisingly agile, in addition to their notable strength. They have an irritable temperament. There are limited numbers of potential apex predators of these bison. Wind Cave National Park by itself, at 33,847 acres, is part of a much larger area of extended grassland prairie. Other large mammals found in the area include elk, coyotes, deer, and pronghorn.

== Genetics ==
The Wind Cave bison herd has minimal cattle introgression. Most private and public bison herds in the United States do. Genetic testing shows that there now appear to be some cattle genes present in approximately 95% of the bison surveyed in other areas.

Though the American bison (Species: Bison bison) is not only a separate species, but a member of a separate genus from domestic cattle (Bos primigenius), they are genetically compatible and American bison can interbreed freely with cattle. Crossbreeds tend to look very much like purebred bison, so appearance is unreliable as a means of determining what is a purebred bison and what is a crossbred cow. Many ranchers deliberately crossbred their bison with cattle, and it would also be expected that there could be some natural hybridization in areas where cattle and bison occur in the same range. Since cattle and bison eat similar food and tolerate similar conditions, they have often been in the same range together in the past, and opportunity for cross breeding may have been common. Most bison today are descendants of five herds that were conserved during the near-extinction event of the late 19th century. These herds were subject to cattle crossbreeding experiments and as a result cattle genes are found throughout most bison populations.

In recent decades tests were developed to determine the source of mitochondrial DNA in cattle and bison, and it was found that most private 'buffalo' herds were actually crossbred with cattle, and even most state and federal buffalo herds had some cattle DNA. With the advent of nuclear microsatellite DNA testing, the number of herds that are known to contain cattle genes has increased. Though approximately 500,000 bison exist on private ranches and in public herds, perhaps only 15,000 to 25,000 of these bison are pure and are not actually bison-cattle hybrids. Significant public bison herds that do not appear to have hybridized domestic cattle genes are the Yellowstone Park bison herd, the Henry Mountains bison herd, which was started with bison taken from Yellowstone Park, the Wind Cave bison herd, and the Wood Buffalo National Park bison herd in Canada and herds derived from it.

A landmark study of bison genetics was undertaken by James Derr of Texas A&M University in an attempt to determine what genetic problems bison might face as they repopulate former areas. It concluded that bison seem to be doing quite well, despite their apparent genetic bottleneck. All of the state-owned bison herds tested contained animals with domestic cattle mitochondrial DNA, with the possible exception of the Henry Mountains bison herd of Utah. Most national herds, except Wind Cave and Yellowstone, also appear to be hybridized.

A separate study by Wilson and Strobeck, published in Genome, was done to define the relationships between different herds of bison in the United States and Canada, and to determine whether the bison at Wood Buffalo National Park in Canada and the Yellowstone Park bison herd were possibly separate subspecies, and not plains bison. Some people had suggested that the Yellowstone Park bison were actually either of the 'athabascae' (wood buffalo) subspecies, or else that they were of an unspecified 'mountain' subspecies. In the study, it was determined that the Wood Buffalo Park bison were actually cross breeds between plains bison and wood bison, but that their predominant genetic makeup was truly that of the expected "wood buffalo" (Bison bison athabascae). However, the Yellowstone Park bison herd were pure plains bison (Bison bison bison), and not any of the other previously suggested subspecies. This is significant for the Wind Cave bison herd, since this herd was founded, in part, with animals from the Yellowstone Park bison herd. The bison in Wind Cave National park were also plains bison, as expected.

== Management ==
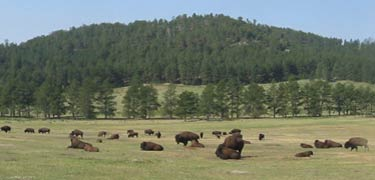
Bison grazing on prairie grasses

With their genetic purity and the healthy condition of the Wind Cave bison, they should have a significant role to play in the re-establishment of bison populations. Private groups, as well as governmental entities in the United States and Canada, are making efforts to return Bison to much of their previous natural range.

A special risk to the Wind Cave bison herd is the potential for the loss of their genetic purity. The herd is one of the few bison herds in the nation that does not seem to contain hybridized genes from domestic cattle. Unfortunately, the bison herd at Custer State Park, only a few miles away, does include herd members that have hybridized cattle genes. Bison from Custer State Park have been found wandering within Wind Cave National Park. No evidence of cross breeding with these bison has yet been found, but many biologists feel that extra care should be taken with these animals in the future.

Unlike the Yellowstone Park bison herd, the Wind Cave bison herd is currently brucellosis-free. Though brucellosis doesn't seem to cause significant problems for bison populations, it is used as a reason for keeping bison inside the Yellowstone National Park and one of the reasons the state of Montana allows hunting of the Yellowstone Bison if they leave the park. Since the Wind Cave herd does not have brucellosis, there is less reason to confine them to the park and less reason to hunt them. Therefore, it should be easier to allow them to increase their population and their range, if other, nearby land areas become available for bison.
