= Melania Cristescu =

Canadian biologist

- Occupation: Ecologist
- Scientific career
- Workplaces: McGill University (2012–); University of Windsor (2006–2012)
- Website: biology.mcgill.ca/faculty/cristescu/

Melania Elena Cristescu is a Romanian–Canadian biologist and ecologist. She is a professor and Canada Research Chair in Ecological Genomics at McGill University and the Co-Editor of Genome.

== Early life ==
Born in Brașov, Cristescu chose her career while examining aquatic habitats in the Danube Delta or exploring trails and caves of the Carpathian Mountains in Transylvania during her childhood summer vacations. The French oceanographer and explorer Jacques Cousteau influenced her. She was also influenced by the books of Ștefan Negrea, a Romanian biologist and speleologist.

== Career ==
Cristescu earned her BSc Honors in Biology at Ovidius University of Constanța in 1996. After spending a year in Rochester, New York studying English, she moved to Canada, where she obtained a Ph.D. in evolutionary biology at the University of Guelph in 2004, under the direction of Paul D. N. Hebert. After working as an NSERC Post-Doctoral Fellow at Indiana University, she became an associate professor at the University of Windsor, where she worked in the Great Lakes Institute for Environmental Research.

Cristescu's area of research is ecological genetics and genomics and her primary research organism is the microcrustacean Daphnia. Her other research areas include the nature and scale of recombination and mutation rate variation across genomes, the genetics of aquatic invasions, and speciation in ancient lakes.
