= Yellowstone bison herd =

Oldest public herd in the United States

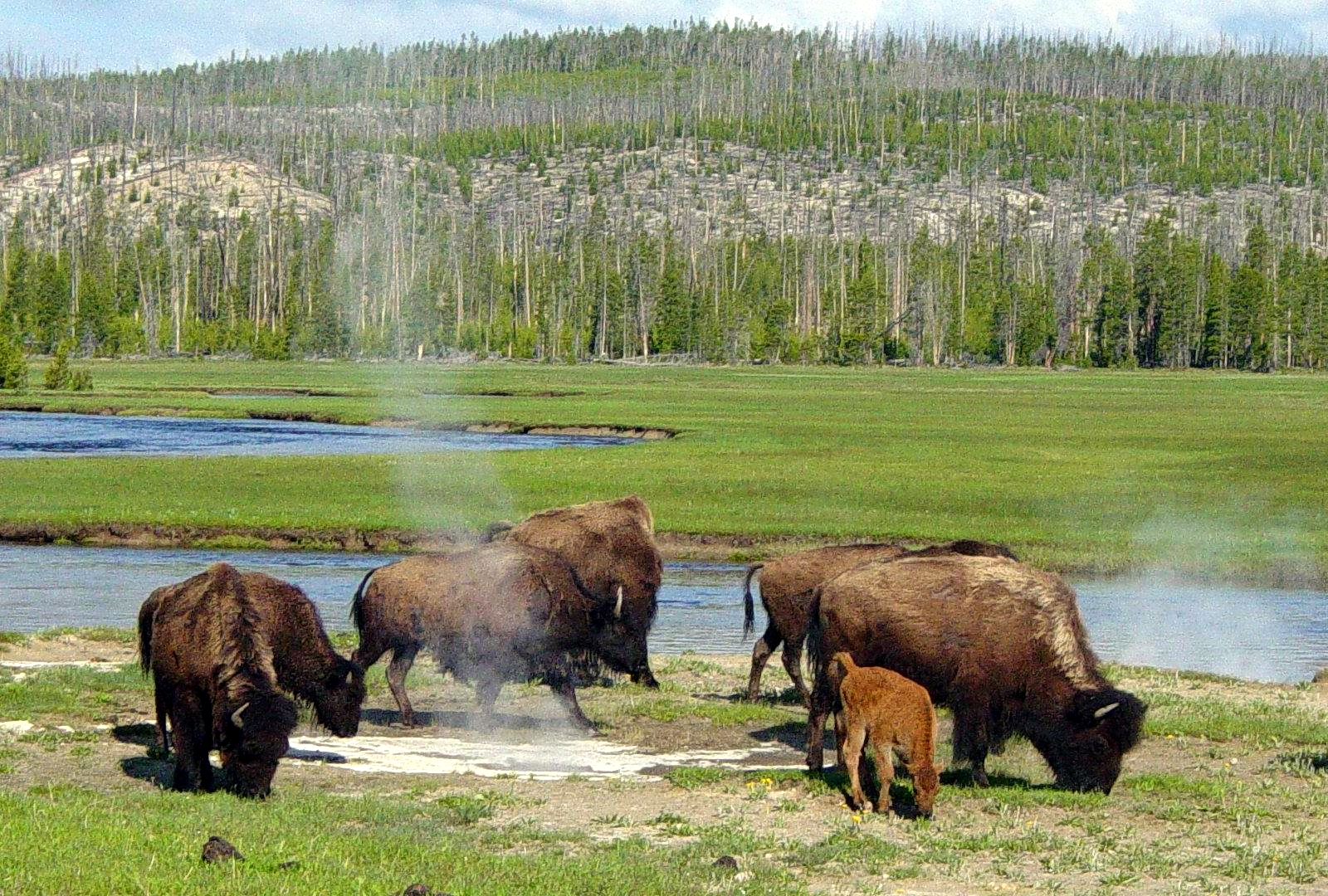
Bison near a hot spring in Yellowstone

The Yellowstone bison herd roams the Greater Yellowstone Ecosystem, which contains Yellowstone National Park. The herd is the oldest and largest public bison herd in the United States, estimated in 2020 to comprise 4,800 bison. The bison are American bison of the plains bison subspecies. The Greater Yellowstone area may be the only location in the United States where free-ranging, wild bison were never extirpated, contrasted with other herds that are composed of bison that have been bred and reintroduced by humans.

== Name ==
Bison are distantly related to the two "true buffalo", the Asian water buffalo and the African buffalo. "Bison" is a Greek word meaning ox-like animal, while "buffalo" originated with the French fur trappers who called these massive beasts bœufs, meaning ox or bullock. The term "buffalo", dates to 1635 in North American usage when the term was first recorded for the American mammal. It has a much longer history than the term bison, which was first recorded in 1774. The Bison is considered to be scientifically correct, as a result of standard usage the name "buffalo" is listed in many dictionaries as an acceptable name for American Buffalo or bison.

== Ecology ==
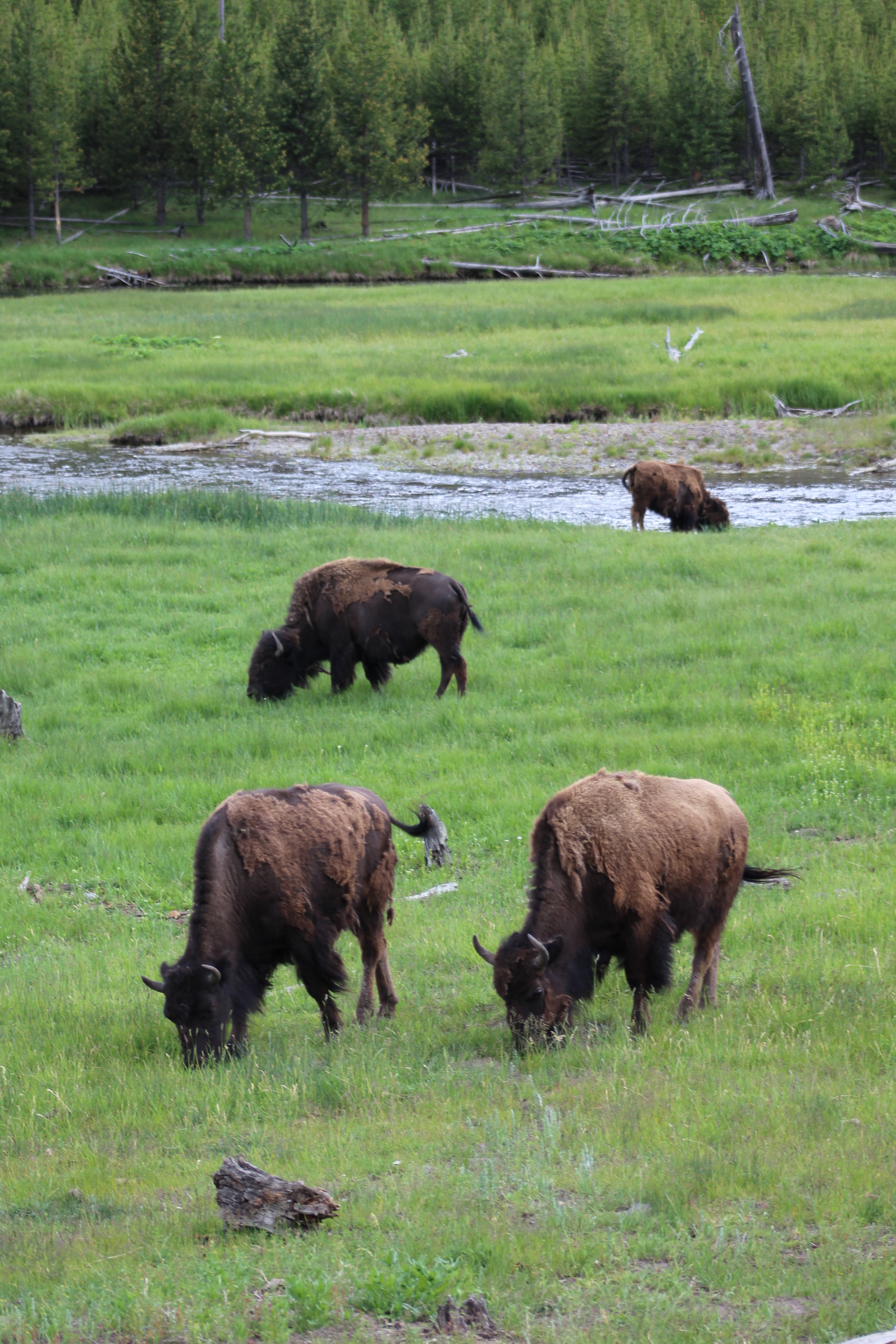
Bison herd grazing in Yellowstone

Yellowstone National Park has large areas of alpine meadows and grass prairie and this provides a nearly optimum environment for American bison who live in river valleys, and on prairies and plains. Their typical habitat is open or semi-open grasslands, as well as sagebrush grasslands, semi-arid lands, and scrublands. Some lightly wooded areas are also known historically to have supported bison. Bison will also graze in hilly or mountainous areas where the slopes are not steep. Though bison are not particularly known as high altitude animals, members of the Yellowstone bison herd are frequently found at elevations above 8,000 feet (2,400 m) and a herd started with founder animals from Yellowstone, the Henry Mountains bison herd, is found on the plains around the Henry Mountains, Utah, as well as in mountain valleys of the Henry Mountains to an altitude of 10,000 feet (3,000 m).

Gray wolves, and grizzly bears are apex predators of bison, but bison meat is not a major component of their diet. Competitive pressure from the other large grazing mammals in Yellowstone may also help limit the number of bison in the herd, but this is not considered to have had a significant effect on bison numbers. Disease, including various viruses, parasites and brucellosis, has a greater effect on bison population.

The Yellowstone bison herd is divided into two sub-herds that are somewhat isolated from each other. The northern range herd which numbers approximately 2,300 individuals ranges from the north entrance near Gardiner, Montana through the Blacktail Plateau and into the Lamar Valley. The central interior herd, which numbers approximately 1,400 individuals, ranges from the Madison River valley into the Hayden Valley and Upper and Lower Geyser Basins.

The Buffalo Field Campaign and Western Watersheds Project filed a petition in 2014 that contends that these herds are two separate groups and are genetically distinct. They asked that the bison be declared endangered or threatened under the Endangered Species Act with a separate population limit for each of the two herds. They claim hunting, trapping, hazing, capture and slaughter of the bison disproportionately impacted the central interior herd, reducing the size of the herd dramatically during the last two decades. The Fish and Wildlife Service rejected the listing in 2015 and 2019, arguing that the herds are not genetically distinct. A judge ruled that the agency applied the wrong standard and failed to address a significant aspect of the question.

== Management ==
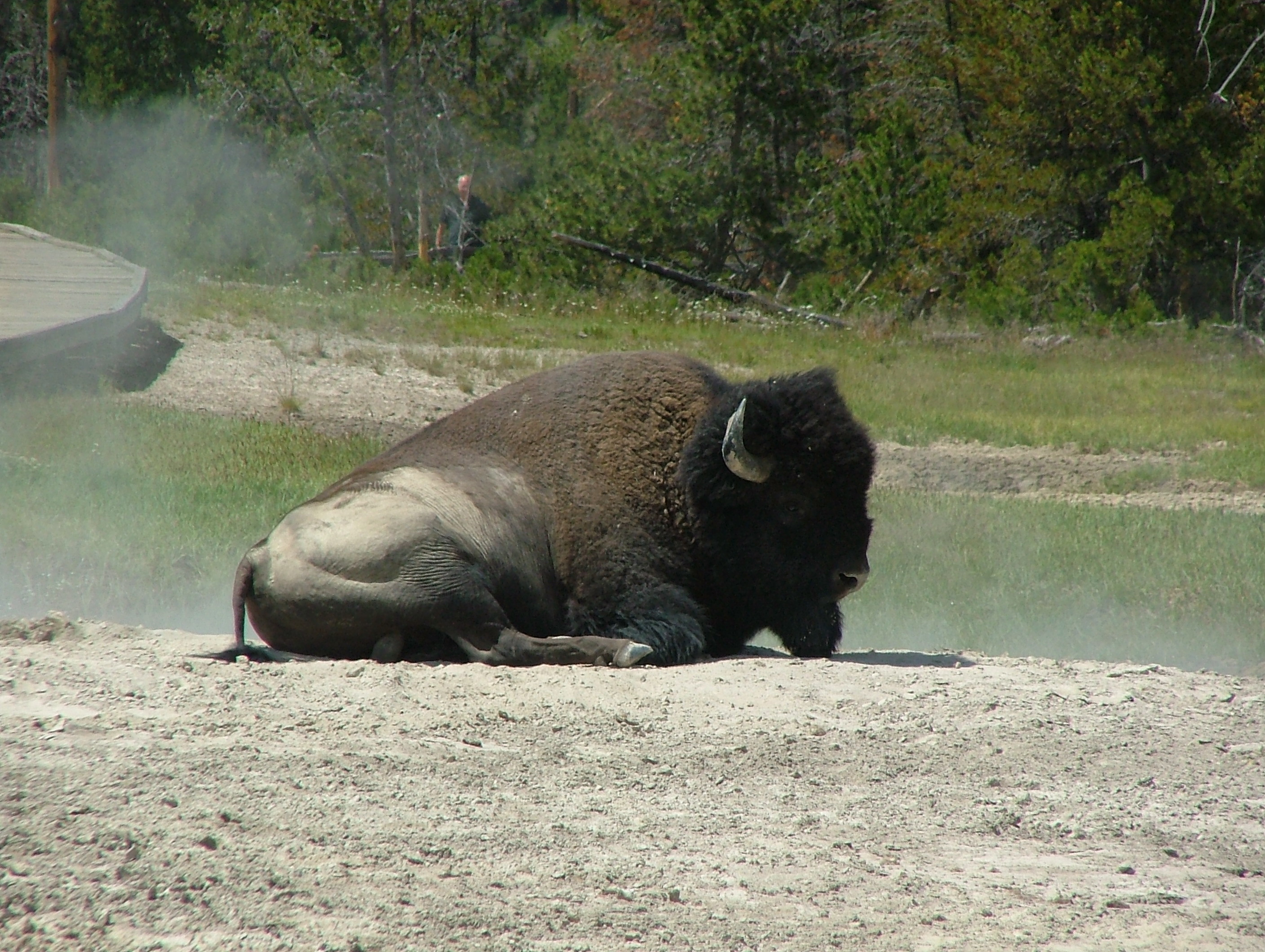
Bison at Black Dragon Caldron

American bison once numbered in the millions, perhaps between 25 and 60 million by some estimates, and were possibly the most numerous large land animal on earth. However, by the late 1880s, they had been hunted to near-extinction throughout North America. The Yellowstone bison herd was the last free-ranging bison herd in the United States, being the only place where bison were not extirpated. The Yellowstone bison herd is descended from a remnant population of 23 individual bison that survived the mass-slaughter of the 19th century in the Pelican Valley of Yellowstone Park. To assist in the species' revival, in 1896 the United States government added one bull and seven cows from the Lincoln Park Zoo to the Yellowstone herd. In 1902, a captive herd of 21 Goodnight plains bison was introduced to the park and then moved to the Lamar Valley and managed as livestock until the 1960s, when a policy of natural regulation was adopted by the park.

Only a few bull bison traversed outside Yellowstone National Park prior to 1975, but as bison numbers increased, groups of bison began migrating across the northern and western boundaries of Yellowstone to expand their winter range and pioneer new territory in the Greater Yellowstone Ecosystem. Over the years, the National Park Service and states bordering the park have implemented various plans to limit exposure of bison to cattle herds outside the park. Efforts have included hunting, hazing bison back into the park, vaccinations, and exporting excess bison to other locations. Brucellosis is known to exist in the elk and bison of the Yellowstone ecosystem. State and federal officials face pressure to prevent the spread of the disease, as ranchers worry it could lead to Montana losing its brucellosis-free status. Montana state law does not allow the transport of wild bison exposed to brucellosis except to meat processing and research facilities within the state. By 2016, state and federal officials were rounding up most bison that wandered outside the park every winter, with up to 900 being removed annually. Some were captured and shipped to slaughter facilities, while others were shot by hunters or state agents. Montana managed a state-licensed bison hunt outside the boundaries of the park from 1985 to 1991, but the number of bison migrating outside of the park continued to increase, prompting the National Park Service to develop management plans to control bison near the park boundaries. Intense controversy grew between environmentalists, livestock interests and agency managers. During harsh winters, bison found convenient grazing on several U.S. Forest Service allotments that were used for cattle in the summer. In 1995, the Montana state legislature designated Yellowstone bison as a species in need of disease management and the state sued the National Park Service for allowing bison to leave the park. After five years of litigation and mediation, the state of Montana and the federal government developed the Interagency Bison Management Plan (IBMP) to guide the management of bison in and around Yellowstone.

=== Interagency Bison Management Plan ===
The Interagency Bison Management Plan is a cooperative, multi-agency effort that guides the management of bison and brucellosis in and around Yellowstone National Park. The National Park Service, USDA-Forest Service, USDA-Animal & Plant Health Inspection Service, Montana Department of Livestock and Montana Fish Wildlife & Parks adopted the first plan in 2000. Since 2009, the Confederated Salish and Kootenai Tribes, the Inter Tribal Buffalo Council, and the Nez Perce Tribe have participated in the planning. The plan is aimed at:

- Maintaining a wild, free-ranging bison population;
- Reducing the risk of brucellosis transmission from bison to cattle;
- Managing bison that leave Yellowstone National Park and enter the state of Montana;
- Maintaining Montana's brucellosis-free status for domestic livestock.

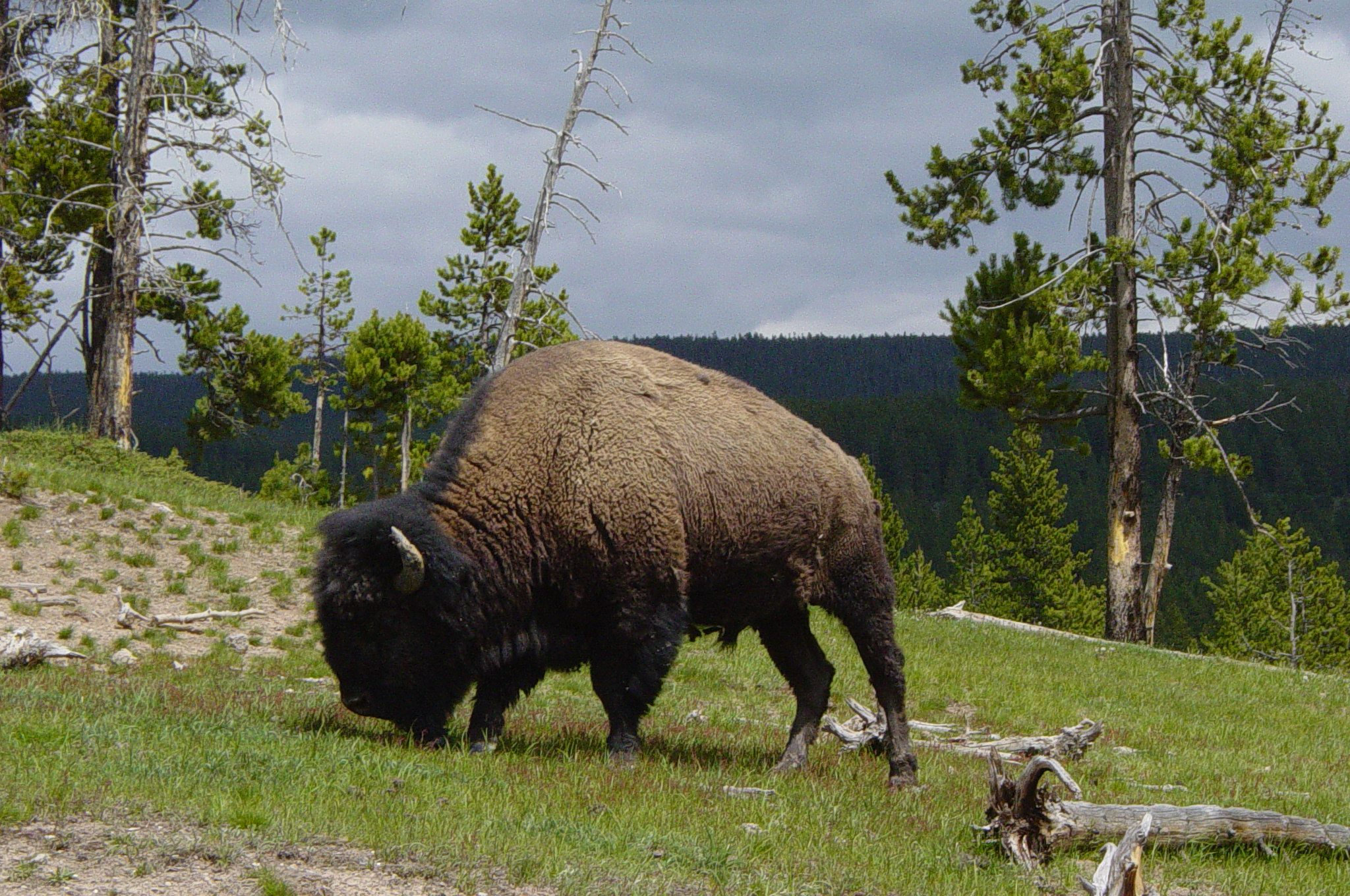
Bull bison in Mud Volcano area

Management is focused on keeping the Yellowstone bison population at levels that limit migration outside the park. Methods include slaughter and exporting excess bison to other suitable habitats. In the decades since the IBMP was created, the bison population has ranged between 2,400 and 5,500 animals. There have been no cases of bison transmitting brucellosis directly to cattle, in part due to efforts by federal and state agencies to maintain separation between these animals. The state of Montana now allows bison to occupy some habitat adjacent to the park that was previously off-limits, including year-round in some areas, which is a major conservation advancement. However, the lack of tolerance for wild bison in most areas outside Yellowstone continues to limit restoration. Large parts of their historic winter ranges are no longer available due to human development and states only allowing limited numbers of bison in areas near the park.

Initially, most of the bison were sent to slaughter with the meat being distributed to participating Native American tribes, along with limited hunting. The IBMP plan includes allowing bison to enter the Bison Conservation Transfer Program as space allows.

=== Hunting ===
While hunting is not allowed within the park, it mainly occurs within an area outside the northern boundary near Gardiner as designated by the state. Removal numbers are decided each year, with tribal and state hunters being allowed a quota. Montana issues hunting permits and 4 tribes have long standing treaty rights to hunt Yellowstone bison.

By 2016, the population had grown to approximately 5,500 animals. In the winters of 2016/2017 and 2019/2020 the park service reduced the herd size by at least 900 animals. A 2022/2023 hunt culled over 1,100 individuals, leading to criticism over the necessity of such a hunt.

=== Bison Conservation Transfer Program ===
Yellowstone bison are exceptional because they form the nation's largest bison population on public land. Developing a quarantine program that complied with Montana state law was critical to getting brucellosis-free animals from Yellowstone to conservation herds. Quarantine was talked about in the 1990s during the negotiations on the IBMP. During 2005–2012, Animal and Plant Health Inspection Service (APHIS) developed and verified procedures for identifying Yellowstone bison that don't have brucellosis. Quarantine worked as bison that repeatedly tested negative for the disease stayed that way and could be certified as brucellosis-free. The initial plan was for the bison that completed the pilot program to be moved to public or tribal lands but the state was not ready to approve any of the proposed locations in 2010. After Montana Governor Brian Schweitzer invited Ted Turner to submit an offer to care for the animals, Turner Enterprises Inc. reached an agreement in February with the Montana Department of Fish, Wildlife and Parks Commission to care for the bison and their offspring for five years on a 12,000-acre fenced section (4,900 ha) of the Flying D ranch. Tribal and state officials signed an agreement in 2012 allowing the transfer of bison that were also in the 2005-2012 pilot study. Sixty-three animals from the Yellowstone quarantine corrals were transferred in March to the Assiniboine and Sioux Tribes who started a conservation herd at their Fort Peck Reservation. A legal challenge blocked further transfers until the state supreme court ruled in June 2013 that the Montana law in question did not apply to tribal lands. The state was asked to move the bison by November 2014 that been regularly tested for brucellosis while being quarantined on behalf of the Montana Fish, Wildlife and Parks at the Bozeman-area ranch owned by Ted Turner. In October, the commission decided to move the animals to the Fort Peck Reservation as the commission recognized that the Fort Peck Fish and Game Department had done a good job of managing the bison including the disease testing. In November, 139 of the Yellowstone bison at the Flying D ranch joined the conservation herd at the Fort Peck Reservation.

Certification involves a multi-year process including holding animals in fenced pastures near the park boundary. The quarantine program approved by IBMP has three phases. First, bison are trapped at the Stephens Creek Bison Capture Facility where they are sorted by age and sex into different enclosed pens. A blood sample is also taken and they are tested for brucellosis with only about 30% of animals qualifying for the program. Bison that test negative can go into quarantine. Next, testing protocols continue until the animals can be certified as disease free. Finally, assurance testing involves another year in isolation with two more tests before the quarantine period is finished. The first two phases currently must be done in a supervised area in the vicinity of the park. APHIS and the Montana Department of Livestock established the final structural specifications and biosecurity requirements for quarantine facilities in June 2017. Two pens in a Yellowstone bison trap were made into quarantine corrals with two layers of fencing in 2017. The two facilities are located at Stephens Creek and Corwin Springs. Quarantine facilities are managed by APHIS who coordinates the transfers with the state of Montana and the Fort Peck tribes. The final phase of assurance testing can be performed at the Fort Peck Indian Reservation in northeastern Montana. During the revision of the Bison Management at Yellowstone National Park by the National Park Service, it was expected that the use of the bison conservation transfer program to restore bison to Tribal lands would be expand.

== Genetics ==
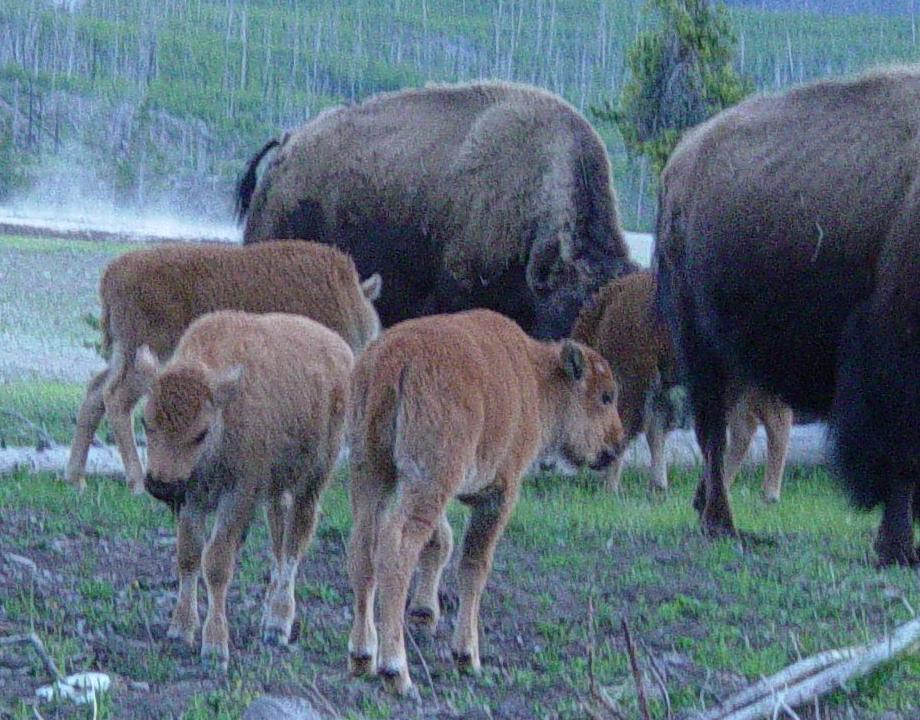
Bison calves in Yellowstone

The Yellowstone bison herd is considered to have minimal cattle gene introgression, meaning that there is no evidence of significant hybridization between these bison and cattle. The bison at Yellowstone National Park have become the foundation animals for many other bison herds throughout the United States, such as the Henry Mountains bison herd and (partially) the Wind Cave bison herd, and several groups in the United States and Canada are making efforts to return bison to nature parks or reserves in parts of their previous natural range. Some large tracts of open range and natural habitat have been purchased by private individuals or groups to prepare for bison reintroduction.

Officially, the "American Buffalo" is classified by the United States Government as a type of cattle, and the government allows private herds to be managed as such. This is a reflection of the characteristics that bison share with cattle. Though the American bison (Bison bison) is not only a separate species, but actually in a separate genus from domestic cattle (Bos primigenius), it clearly has a lot of genetic compatibility with the latter, and American bison can interbreed freely with cattle. Moreover, when they do interbreed, the crossbreeds tend to look very much like purebred bison, so appearance is completely unreliable as a means of determining what is a purebred bison and what is crossbred with cattle. Many ranchers have deliberately crossbred their cattle with bison, and it would also be expected that there could be some natural hybridization in areas where cattle and bison occur in the same range. Since cattle and bison eat similar food and tolerate similar conditions, they have often been in the same range together in the past, and opportunity for cross breeding may sometimes have been common.

In recent decades, tests were developed to determine the source of mitochondrial DNA in cattle and bison, and it was found that most private 'buffalo' herds were actually crossbred with cattle, and even most state and federal buffalo herds had some cattle DNA. With the advent of nuclear microsatellite DNA testing, the number of herds that identified to contain cattle genes has increased. DNA from domestic cattle (Bos taurus) has been detected in nearly all bison herds examined to date. Significant public bison herds that have minimal cattle gene introgression are the Yellowstone bison herd, the Henry Mountains bison herd (which was started with bison taken from Yellowstone), the Wind Cave bison herd, the Elk Island National Park bison herd, and the Wood Buffalo National Park bison herd and subsidiary herds descended from it, in Canada.

A landmark study of bison genetics that was performed by James Derr of the Texas A&M University corroborated this. The Derr study was undertaken in an attempt to determine what genetic problems bison might face as they repopulate former areas, and it noted that bison were faring well, despite their apparent genetic bottleneck. One possible explanation for this might be the small amount of domestic cattle genes that are now in most bison populations, though this is not the only possible explanation for bison success.

In the study, cattle genes were also found in small amounts throughout most herds. "The hybridization experiments conducted by some of the owners of the five foundation herds of the late 1800s, have left a legacy of a small amount of cattle genetics in many of our existing bison herds." He also said, "All of the state owned bison herds tested (except for possibly one) contain animals with domestic cattle mtDNA." It appears that the one state herd that had no cattle genes was the Henry Mountains bison herd in the Henry Mountains of Utah, which were descended from transplanted animals from Yellowstone Park. It is unknown if the Book Cliffs extension of this herd in Central Utah is also free of hybridization; the extension involved mixing the founders with additional bison from another source.

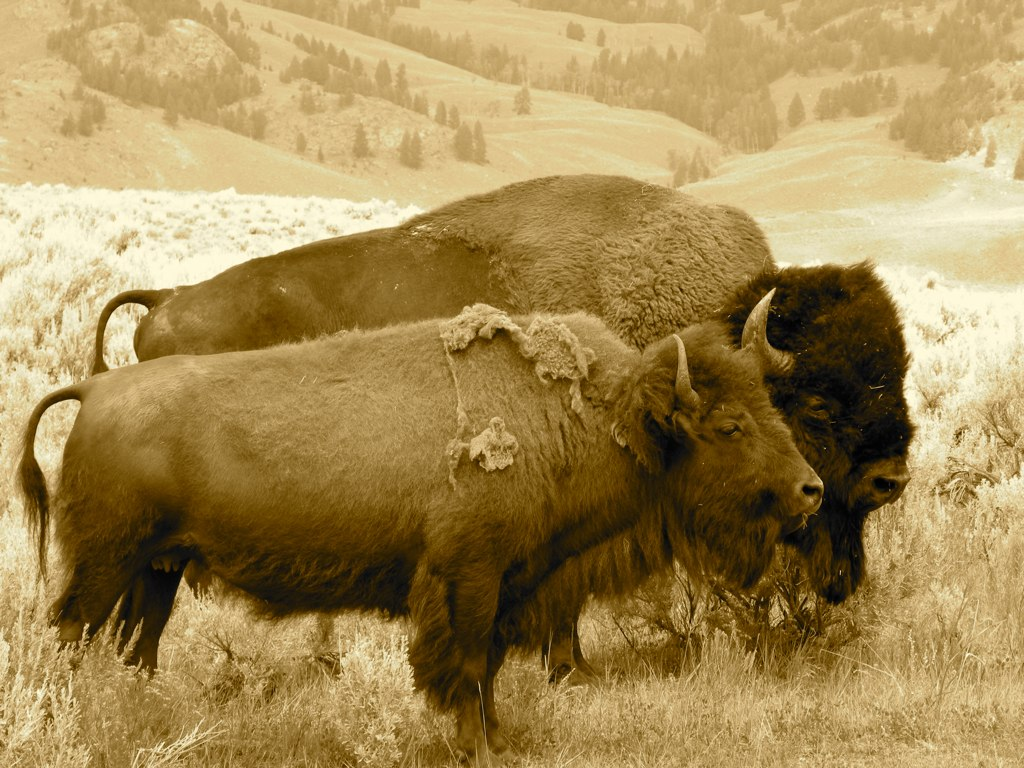
Buffalo bison pair

A separate study by Wilson and Strobeck, published in Genome, was done to define the relationships between different herds of bison in the United States and Canada, and to determine whether the bison at Wood Buffalo National Park in Canada and the Yellowstone bison herd were possibly separate subspecies, and not Plains bison. Some people had suggested that the Yellowstone bison were actually either of the B. b. athabascae (wood buffalo) subspecies, or else that they were of an unspecified 'mountain' subspecies. In the study, it was determined that the Wood Buffalo bison were actually cross breeds between plains bison and wood bison, but that their predominant genetic makeup was in fact that of the expected "wood buffalo" (B. b. athabascae).

== In popular culture ==
Circa winter 1924, Yellowstone hosted about 2,000 bison and the whole population was herded together to appear in a stampede scene for The Thundering Herd, a 1925 Paramount Pictures adaptation of a Zane Grey novel. (The 2,000 number was very possibly a publicist's exaggeration; in September 1925, The New York Times reported there were about 800 animals in the Yellowstone herd.)

== See also ==
- American Bison Society
- Animals of Yellowstone
- European bison
- Elk Island National Park bison
- List of Yellowstone National Park-related articles
