= Genome (journal) =

- Discipline: Genetics, Genomics
- Language: English, French
- Edited by: Melania Cristescu and Lewis Lukens

Publication details
- Former names: Canadian Journal of Genetics and Cytology (1959–1986)
- History: 1959–present
- Publisher: NRC Research Press (Canada)
- Frequency: Monthly
- Impact factor: 1.8 (2024)

Standard abbreviations
- ISO 4: Genome

Indexing
- ISSN: 0831-2796

Links
- Journal homepage

Genome, formerly known as the Canadian Journal of Genetics and Cytology (1959–1986), is a monthly peer-reviewed scientific journal that published since 1959 by NRC Research Press. Genome prints articles in the fields of genetics and genomics, including cytogenetics, molecular and evolutionary genetics, population genetics, and developmental genetics. Genome is affiliated with the Canadian Society for Molecular Biosciences, and is co-edited by Melania Cristescu of McGill University and Lewis Lukens of University of Guelph.
