= Henry Mountains bison herd =

Free-range on public lands in Utah

The animals in the Henry Mountains bison herd are of the plains bison subspecies (Bison bison bison). The bison in the Henry Mountains herd is one of two herds maintained by the state of Utah. The other is the Antelope Island bison herd. The Henry Mountains Bison Herd has recently extended into the mountains of the Book Cliffs, and this may become a third bison herd for the state.

Yellowstone National Park may be the only location in the United States where free-ranging bison were never exterminated since they continued to exist in the wild and were not re-introduced as has been done in most other bison herd areas. As a result, the Yellowstone Park bison herd became the foundation herd for many others in the United States, including the Henry Mountains bison herd.

== Location and habitat ==
The Henry Mountains bison herd is located mostly with the 2 million acres (8,100 km^{2}) of land on or around the Henry Mountains of south-central Utah. An ongoing attempt is being made to expand the herd to include areas in the mountains of the Book Cliffs which are farther north.

American bison (Bison bison) live in river valleys, prairies, and plains. Typical habitat is open or semi-open grasslands, as well as sagebrush, semi-arid lands and scrublands. Some lightly wooded areas are known historically to have supported bison. Bison will graze in hilly or mountainous areas where the slopes are not steep. Though not particularly known as high altitude animals, bison in the Henry Mountains herd are found throughout the Henry Mountains area, on public lands, including the desert lowlands and the mountainous regions to 10,000 feet (3,000 m) altitude. They are particularly prominent in the midlevel grassy areas.

== History ==
The American bison once numbered in the millions, perhaps between 25 million and 60 million by some estimates, and they were possibly the most numerous large land animal on earth. However, they were hunted to near extinction throughout North America by the late 1880s. The Henry Mountain bison herd was started with animals transplanted from the Yellowstone bison herd, which was likely the last free-ranging bison herd in the United States and the only location where they did not go locally extinct in the United States.

The original 18 animals of the Henry Mountains herd were transplanted from Yellowstone National Park in 1941. They were released not into the mountains, but the arid desert of Robbers Roost, approximately 50 miles northeast of their eventual home. In 1942, another five bulls were added to the herd. That same year, the herd moved to the comparatively verdant grassland of the Henrys and across the Dirty Devil River to the Burr Desert at the north end of the mountain range. In 1963, the herd moved again, this time into the mountains, abandoning the desert life. The herd thrived in the new locale and quickly grew to about 80 animals. Today, the herd consists of between 300-400 animals, which is regarded as the maximum the range will support.

Recently, the herd is competing with livestock for summer range forage. This has created the potential for conflict between cattle ranchers and sportsmen who consider the Henry Mountains prime bison hunting country. Special licenses are issued annually to hunt the animals and help reduce the excess population. In 2009, 146 public once-in-a-lifetime Henry Mountain bison hunting permits were issued. In recent years, each bison permit that has been issued by the state of Utah has had 100 applicants.

A population objective of 325 bison by 2012 was set by Utah wildlife biologists for the Henry Mountain herd. Since the bison reproduce easily and the herds have been larger than this in the past, a decision was made to reduce the size of the herd. To achieve this objective, and increase overall genetic diversity, breeding animals are being transplanted to other locations from the herd. In 2009, Utah Division of Wildlife Resources officials transplanted 31 bison from the Henry Mountains to the Book Cliffs in eastern Utah. The new group joined 14 animals previously released in 2008 from a private herd on the nearby Uintah and Ouray Indian Reservation.

== Ecology ==
The Henry Mountains have some areas of Alpine meadows and grass prairie and this provides a nearly optimum environment for American bison. Bison are large herd animals that defend their young vigorously. American bison can run up to 35 miles per hour and are surprisingly agile, in addition to their notable strength and irritable temperament. However, in the Henry Mountains there are no significant apex predators, except for human beings. In the past, there were apex predators in these regions, but the predators have also been eliminated for the most part, because of their suspected history of predation upon open range cattle and sheep, as well as concerns in the past about the potential danger of human interactions.

Significant apex predators that could help control the bison population would include grizzly bears and wolves. Some people suggest that the Henry Mountains could support a population of these predators if they were re-introduced. Other large mammals found in the Henry Mountains include elk, moose, coyotes, mountain lions, bobcats, mule deer, pronghorn, and bighorn sheep. Competitive pressure from the other large grazing mammals in the Henry Mountains may also help limit the number of bison in the herd, but this is not considered to have a significant effect on bison numbers. At the same time, unlike the population of bison in the Yellowstone Park bison herd, the Henry Mountain bison are relatively free of disease, especially brucellosis.

Each year in late autumn, a small number of bison hunting permits are issued by the state of Utah. The herd is maintained by the state as a multi-purpose herd. One reason for the existence of the herd is an attempt to help repopulate bison into some of their previous natural range. But a second purpose is for management as a big game herd, and hunting is allowed under limited conditions.

== Genetics ==
The Antelope Island bison herd, also managed by the state of Utah, has some cattle genes present. However, the Henry Mountains bison herd has been shown to be purebred Bison bison based on genetic testing of mitochondrial and nuclear DNA. This 2015 study also showed that the Henry Mountains bison herd is free of brucellosis, a bacterial disease that was imported with non-native domestic cattle to North America.

Officially, the "American Buffalo" is classified by the United States government as a type of cattle, and the government allows private herds to be managed as such. This is a reflection of the characteristics that bison share with cattle. Though the bison is a separate genus from domestic cattle (Bos primigenius), they clearly have a lot of genetic compatibility, and American bison can interbreed freely with cattle. Moreover, when they do interbreed, the crossbreeds tend to look very much like purebred bison, so appearance is unreliable as a means of determining what is a purebred bison and what is a crossbred cow. Many ranchers have deliberately cross bred their cattle with bison, and it would also be expected that there could be some natural hybridization in areas where cattle and bison occur in the same range. Since cattle and bison eat similar food and tolerate similar conditions, they have often been in the same range together in the past, and opportunity for crossbreeding may sometimes have been common.

In recent decades, tests were developed to determine the source of mitochondrial DNA in cattle and bison, and it was found that most private herds were actually crossbred with cattle, and even most state and federal herds had some cattle DNA. With the advent of nuclear microsatellite DNA testing, the number of herds that contained cattle genes has increased. Though approximately 500,000 bison exist on private ranches and in public herds, some people estimate that perhaps only 15,000 to 25,000 of these bison are pure and are not actually bison-cattle hybrids. "DNA from domestic cattle (Bos taurus) has been detected in nearly all bison herds examined to date." Significant public bison herds that do not appear to have hybridized domestic cattle genes are the Yellowstone bison herd, the Henry Mountains bison herd which was started with bison taken from Yellowstone Park, the Wind Cave bison herd and the Wood Buffalo National Park bison herd and subsidiary herds started from it, in Canada.

A landmark study of bison genetics that was performed by James Derr of the Texas A&M University corroborated this. The Derr study was undertaken in an attempt to determine what genetic problems bison might face as they repopulate former areas, and it noted that bison seem to be doing quite well, despite their apparent genetic bottleneck. One possible explanation for this might be the small amount of domestic cattle genes that are now in most bison populations, though this is not the only possible explanation for bison success. In the study cattle genes were also found in small amounts throughout most herds. "The hybridization experiments conducted by some of the owners of the five foundation herds of the late 1800s, have left a legacy of a small amount of cattle genetics in many of our existing bison herds." Derr states "All of the state owned bison herds tested (except for possibly one) contain animals with domestic cattle mtDNA." It appears that the one state herd that had no cattle genes was the Henry Mountains bison herd. However, the extension of this herd into the Book Cliffs involved mixing the founders with additional bison from another source, so it is not known if the Book Cliff extension of the herd is also free of cattle hybridization.

A separate study by Wilson and Strobeck, published in Genome, was done to define the relationships between different herds of bison in the United States and Canada, and to determine whether the bison at Wood Buffalo National Park and the Yellowstone bison herd were possibly separate subspecies, and not plains bison (Bison bison bison). Some scientists had previously suggested that the Yellowstone bison were either of the athabascae (wood bison) subspecies, or that they were a type of 'Mountain bison' subspecies. It was determined by the study that the Wood Buffalo Park bison were actually crossbreeds between plains bison and wood bison, but that their predominant genetic makeup was truly that of the expected Wood Buffalo. However, the Yellowstone bison herd were pure plains bison, and not any of the other previously suggested subspecies. Since the Yellowstone herd are plains bison, that would indicate that the Henry Mountain herd are also plains bison.

== Future ==
There remain various questions and concerns regarding future management of the Henry Mountain bison herd. Several private groups, as well as governmental entities in the United States and Canada are making efforts to return bison to much of their previous natural range. Some private groups have purchased large tracts of lands, and some lands are in the process of being prepared for bison introduction. Currently, some state and national parks have habitat for bison, but most of these already have bison present.

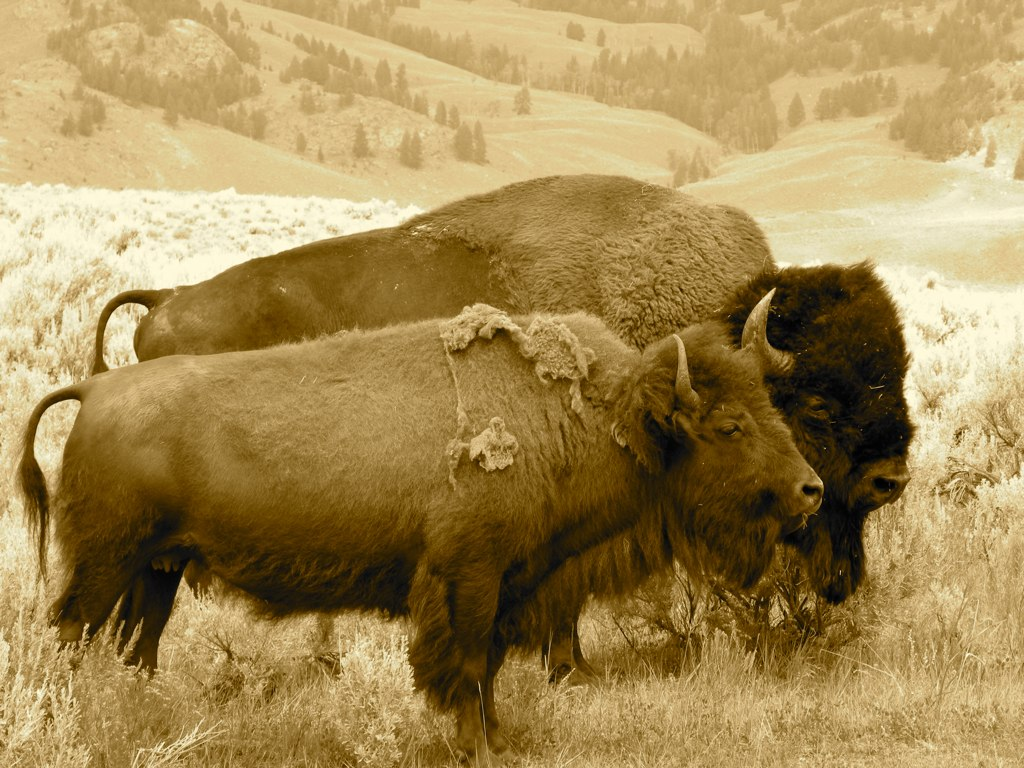
Bison pair

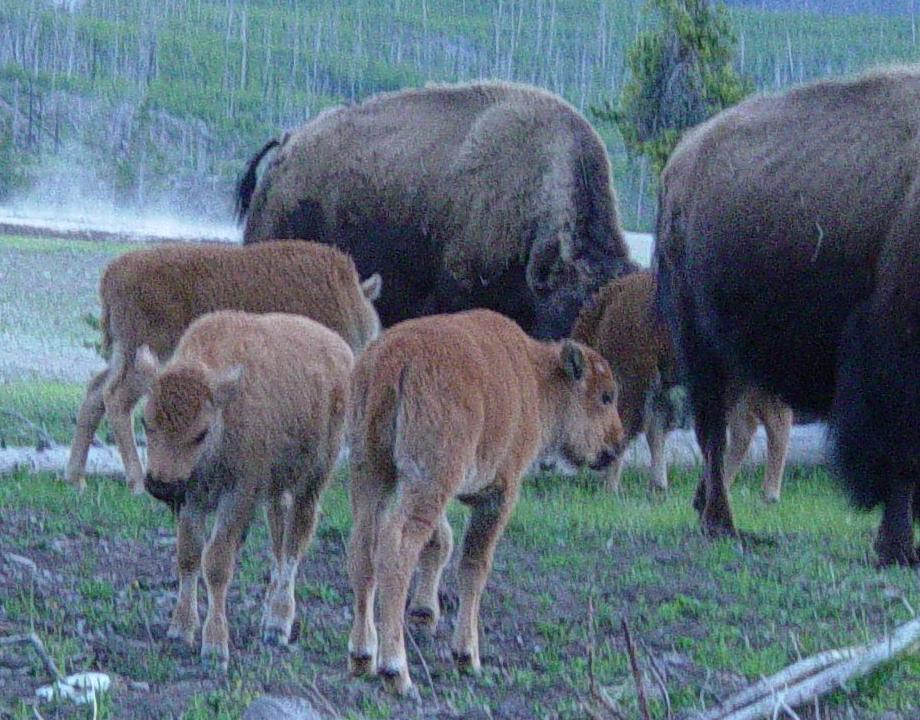
Bison calves
