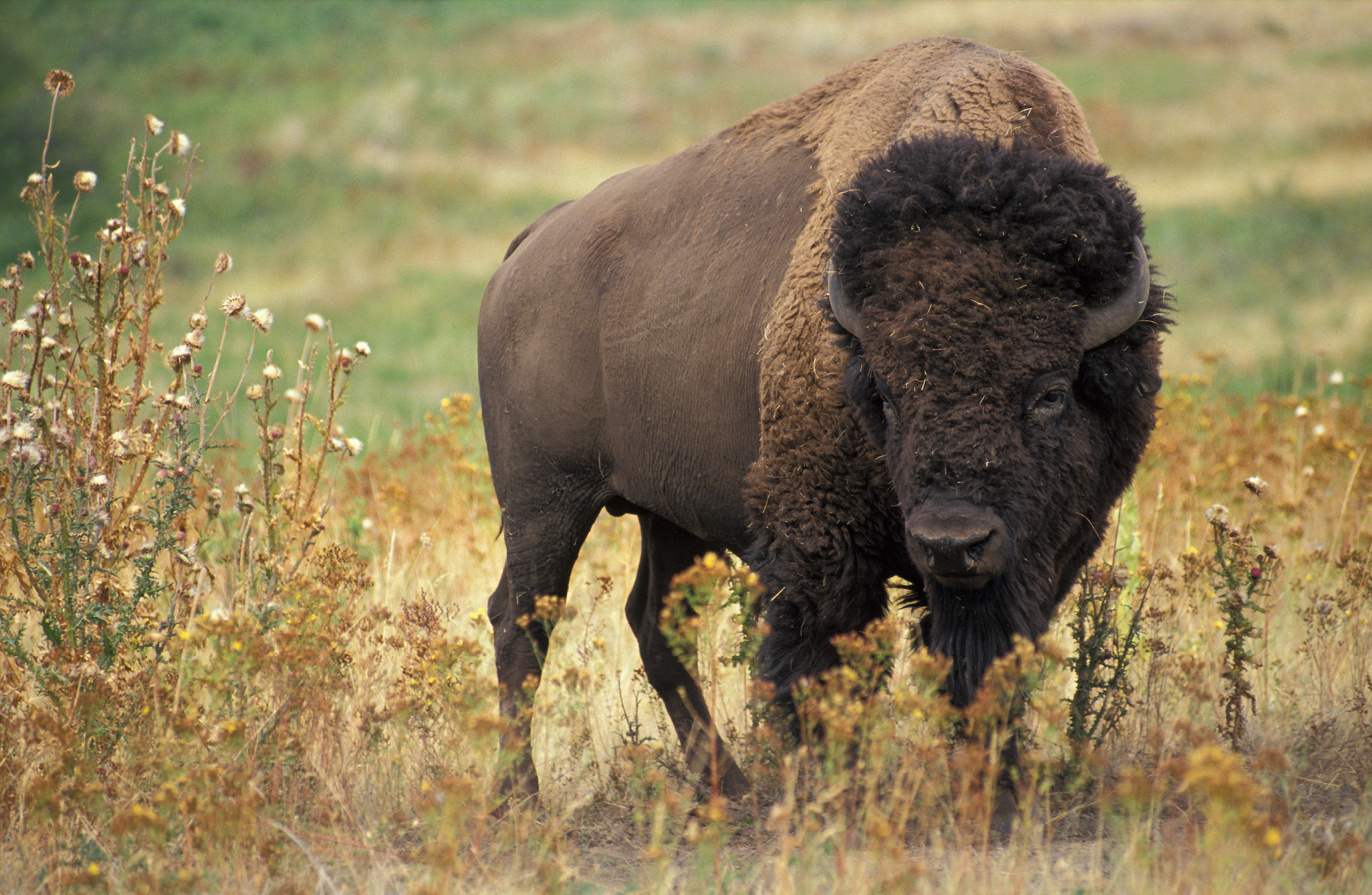
- Plains bison (Bison bison bison)
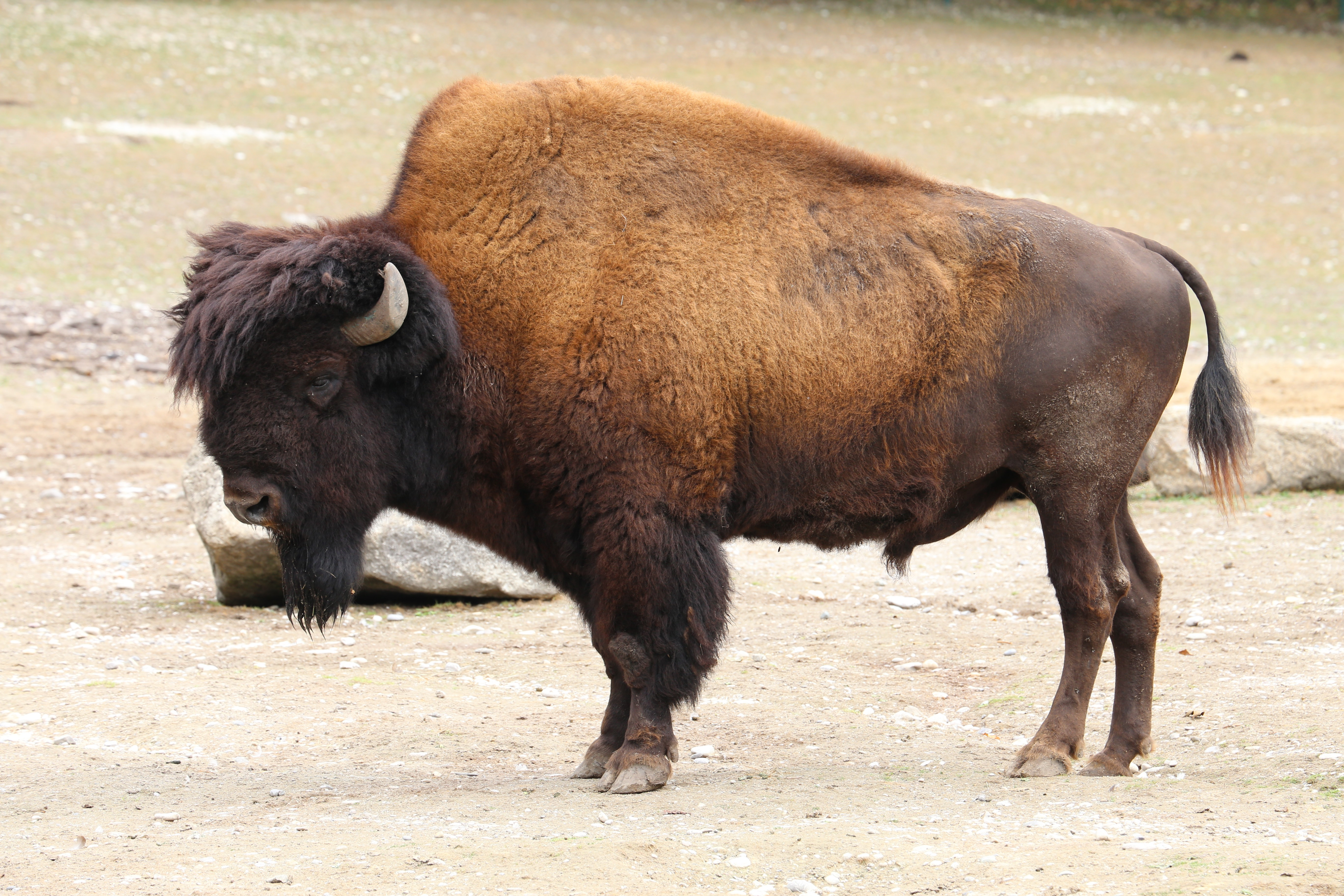
- Wood bison (Bison bison athabascae)

Conservation status
- Near Threatened (IUCN 3.1)

Scientific classification
- Kingdom: Animalia
- Phylum: Chordata
- Class: Mammalia
- Order: Artiodactyla
- Family: Bovidae
- Subfamily: Bovinae
- Genus: Bos
- Subgenus: Bison
- Species: B. bison

Binomial name
- Bison bison (Linnaeus, 1758)

Subspecies
- B. b. athabascae (wood bison); B. b. bison (plains bison)
- IUCN range of the two American bison subspecies Plains bison (Bison bison subsp. bison) Wood bison (Bison bison subsp. athabascae)

Synonyms
- Bos americanus Gmelin, 1788; Bos bison Linnaeus, 1758; Bison americanus (Gmelin, 1788); Bison bison montanae Krumbiegel, 1980

Audio
- Bison call

= American bison =

American bison Temporal range: 0.01–0 Ma Early Holocene – present

Species of bovid mammal

The American bison (Bison bison; pl.: bison), commonly known as the American buffalo, or simply buffalo (not to be confused with true buffalo), is a species of bison that is endemic to North America. It is one of two extant species of bison, along with the European bison. Its historical range circa 9000 BC is referred to as the great bison belt, a tract of rich grassland spanning from Alaska south to the Gulf of Mexico, and east to the Atlantic Seaboard (nearly to the Atlantic tidewater in some areas), as far north as New York, south to Georgia, and according to some sources, further south to northern Florida, with sightings in North Carolina near Buffalo Ford on the Catawba River as late as 1750.

Two subspecies or ecotypes have been described: the plains bison (B. b. bison), smaller and with a more rounded hump; and the wood bison (B. b. athabascae), the larger of the two and having a taller, square hump. There has been a proposal to divide the plains bison into subspecies of northern (B. b. montanae) and southern (B. b. bison), but this proposal has limited scientific support. The wood bison is one of the largest wild species of extant bovid in the world, surpassed only by the Asian gaur. With wild animals weighing up to 1,270 kg (2,800 lb), the bison is among the heaviest extant land animals in North America and the heaviest herbivore.

Once roaming in vast herds, the species nearly became extinct by a combination of commercial hunting and slaughter in the 19th century and introduction of bovine diseases from domestic cattle. With an estimated population of 60 million in the late 18th century, the species was reduced to 541 animals by 1889 as part of the genocide of the Native Americans, because the American bison was a major resource for their traditional way of life (food source, hides for clothing and shelter, and horns and bones for tools). Recovery efforts expanded in the mid-20th century, with a resurgence to roughly 31,000 wild bison as of March 2019. For many years, the population was primarily found in a few national parks and reserves. As a result of multiple reintroductions, the species freely roams wild in several regions in the United States, Canada and Mexico. Others are kept in smaller natural areas as conservation herds, while some are also kept in private commercial herds. The American bison has also been introduced in Russia, with a population established in Ingilor Nature Park in Yakutia.

Spanning back millennia, Indigenous peoples of the Great Plains have had cultural and spiritual connections to the American bison. It is the national mammal of the United States.

== Etymology ==
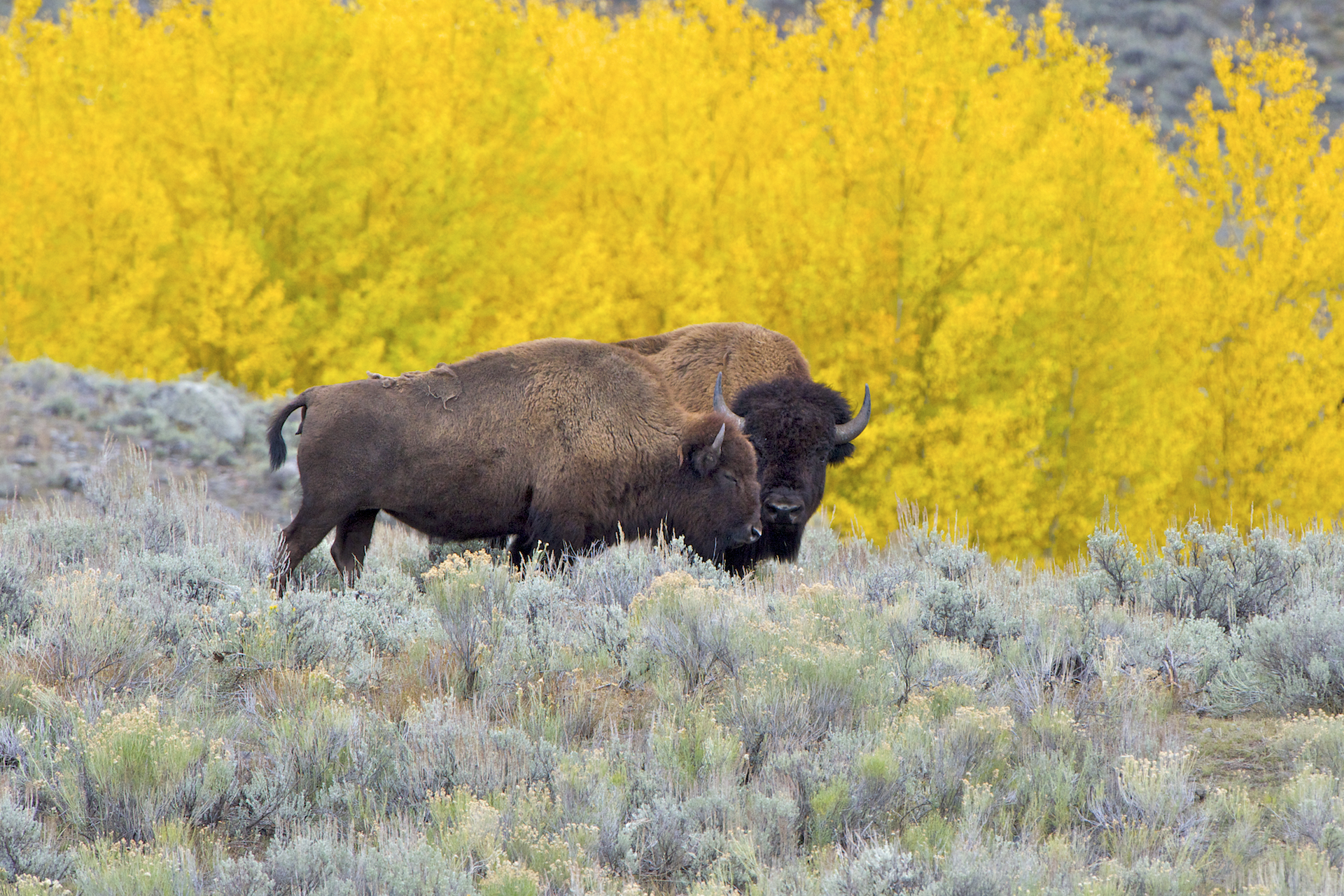
Adult male (behind) and adult female (in front), in Yellowstone National Park

In American English, both buffalo and bison are considered correct terms for the American bison. However, in British English, the word buffalo is reserved for the African buffalo and water buffalo and not used for the bison.

In English usage, the term buffalo was used to refer to the American mammal as early as 1625. The word bison was applied in the 1690s.

Buffalo was applied to the American bison by Samuel de Champlain as the French word buffles in 1616 (published 1619), after seeing skins and a drawing. These were shown to him by members of the Nipissing First Nation, who said they traveled forty days (from east of Lake Huron) to trade with another nation who hunted the animals. Buffel in turn comes from Portuguese bufalo (water buffalo), which comes from Latin bufalus (an antelope, gazelle, or wild ox), from Greek boubalos. The same Greek word boubalos is also the origin for the Bubal hartebeest.

Bison was borrowed from French bison in the early 17th century, from Latin bison (aurochs), from a Proto-Germanic word similar to wisent and, per Etymonline, first applied to American buffalo in the 1690s.

In Plains Indian languages in general, male and female bison are distinguished, with each having a different designation rather than there being a single generic word covering both sexes. Thus:

- in Arapaho: bii (bison cow), henéécee (bison bull)
- in Lakota: pté (bison cow), tȟatȟáŋka (bison bull)

Such a distinction is not a general feature of the language (for example, Arapaho possesses gender-neutral terms for other large mammals such as elk, mule deer, etc.), and so presumably is due to the special significance of the bison in Plains Indian life and culture.

== Description ==
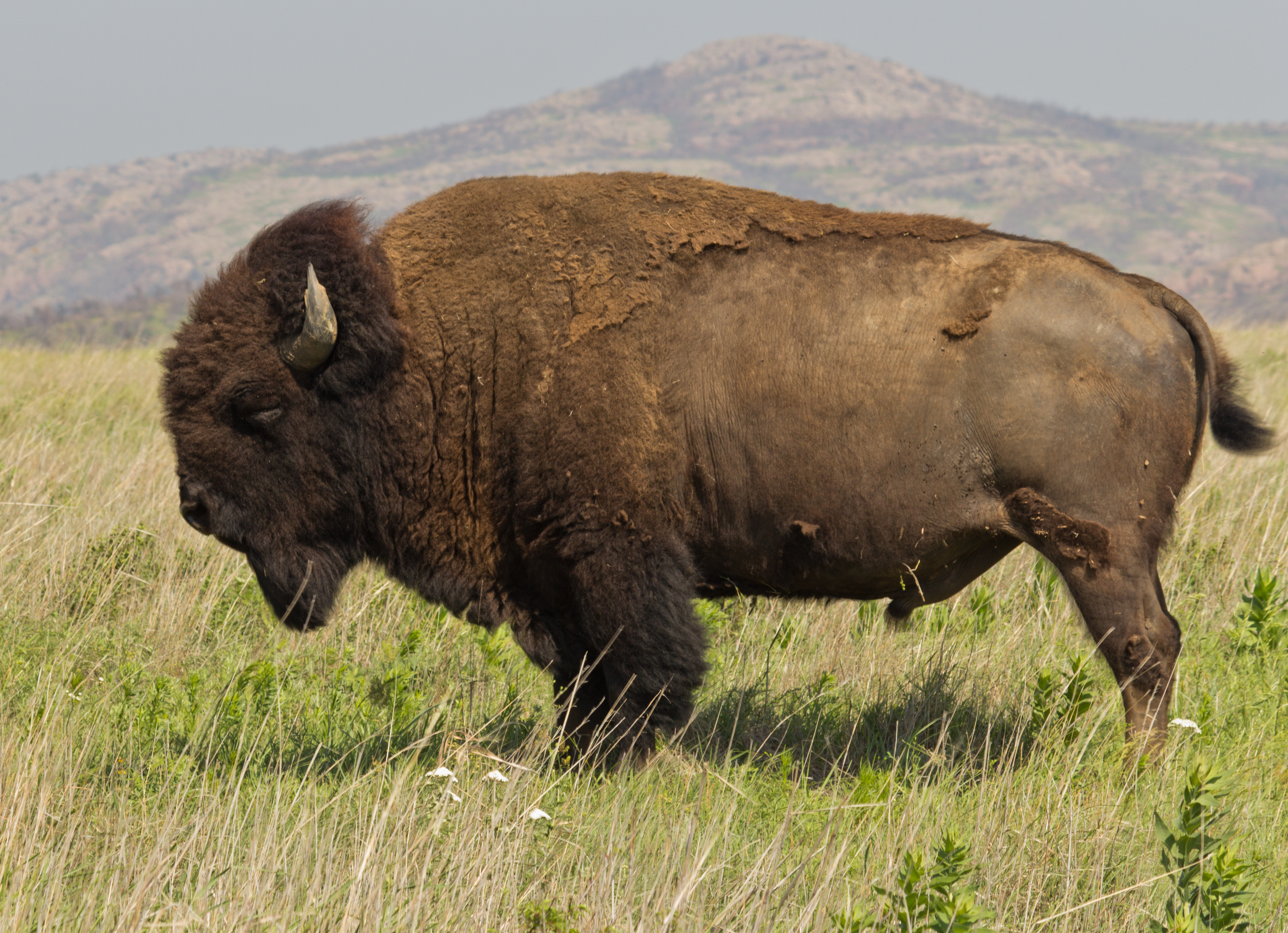
Male plains bison in the Wichita Mountains of Oklahoma

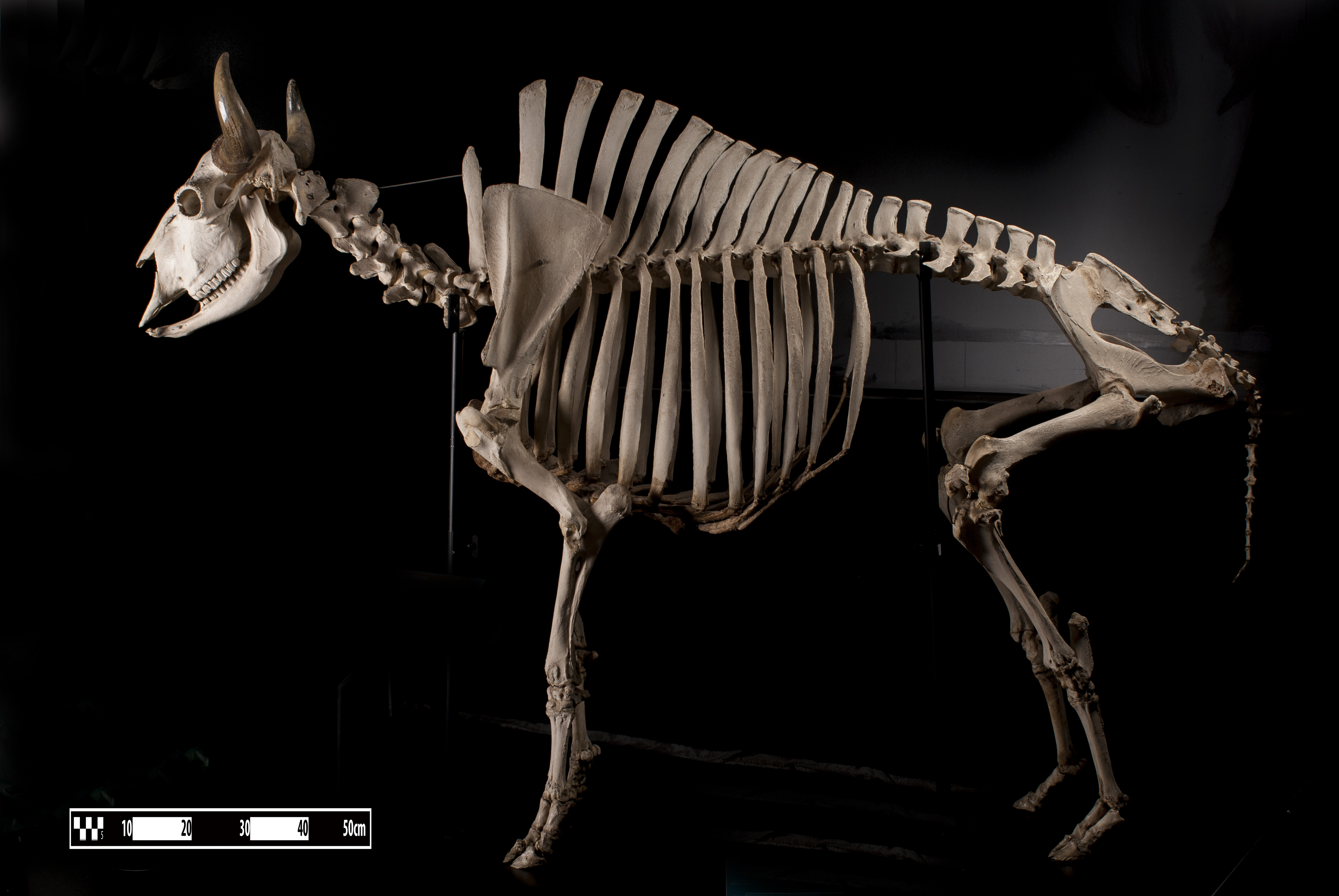
Skeleton of plains bison.

Plains bison galloping, photos by Eadweard Muybridge, first published in 1887 in Animal Locomotion

A bison has a shaggy, long, dark-brown winter coat, and a lighter-weight, lighter-brown summer coat. Male bison are significantly larger and heavier than females. Plains bison are often in the smaller range of sizes, and wood bison in the larger range. Head-rump lengths at maximum up to 3.5 m (11 ft 6 in) for males and 2.85 m (9 ft 4 in) for females long and the tail adding 30 to 95 cm (1 ft 0 in to 3 ft 1 in). Heights at withers in the species can reach up to 186 to 201 cm (6 ft 1 in to 6 ft 7 in) for B. b. bison and B. b. athabascae respectively. Typically weights can range from 318 to 1,179 kg (701 to 2,599 lb), 460 to 988 kg (1,014 to 2,178 lb) with medians of 730 to 792.5 kg (1,609 to 1,747 lb) (B.b. bison) and 943.6 kg (2,080 lb) (B.b.athabascae) in males, and 360 to 640 kg (790 to 1,410 lb) with medians of 450 to 497.6 kg (992 to 1,097 lb) in females, although the lowest weights probably representing typical weight around the age of sexual maturity at 2 to 3 years of age.

The heaviest wild bull for B.b.bison ever recorded weighed 1,270 kg (2,800 lb) while there had been bulls estimated to be 1,400 kg (3,000 lb). B.b.athabascae is significantly larger and heavier on average than B.b.bison while the number of recorded samples for the former was limited after the rediscovery of a relatively pure herd. Elk Island National Park, which has wild populations of both wood and plains bison, has recorded maximum weights for bull bison of 1,186 kg (2,615 lb) (plains) and 1,099 kg (2,423 lb) (wood), but noted that three-quarters of all bison over 1,000 kg (2,200 lb) were wood bison. When raised in captivity and farmed for meat, the bison can grow unnaturally heavy and the largest semidomestic bison weighed 1,724 kg (3,801 lb). The heads and forequarters are massive, and both sexes have short, curved horns that can grow up to 60 cm (2 ft) long with 90 cm (3 ft) to 124 cm (4 ft) width, which they use in fighting for status within the herd and for defense.

For the first two months of life, calves are lighter in color than mature bison. Though extremely rare, white buffalos exist.

== Evolution ==
Bison are members of the tribe Bovini. Genetic evidence from nuclear DNA indicates that the closest living relatives of bison are yaks, with bison being nested within the genus Bos, rendering Bos without including bison paraphyletic. While nuclear DNA indicates that the two living bison species are each other's closest living relatives, the mitochondrial DNA of European bison is more closely related to that of domestic cattle and aurochs, which is suggested to be the result of either incomplete lineage sorting or ancient introgression.

Bison first appeared in Asia during the Early Pleistocene, around 2.6 million years ago. Bison only arrived in North America 195,000 to 135,000 years ago, during the late Middle Pleistocene, descending from the widespread Siberian steppe bison (Bison priscus), which had migrated through Beringia. Following their first appearance in North America, the bison rapidly differentiated into new species, such as the largest of all bison, the long-horned Bison latifrons, along with Bison antiquus. The first appearance of bison in North America is considered to define the regional Rancholabrean faunal stage, due to its major impact on the ecology of the continent. Modern American bison are thought to have evolved from B. antiquus at the end of the Late Pleistocene - beginning of the Holocene, with likely intermediates between the species referred to as Bison "occidentalis". The North American bison population experienced demographic stability during the Middle Holocene but began a slow decline in the Late Holocene beginning about 2,700 BP.

=== Differences from European bison ===
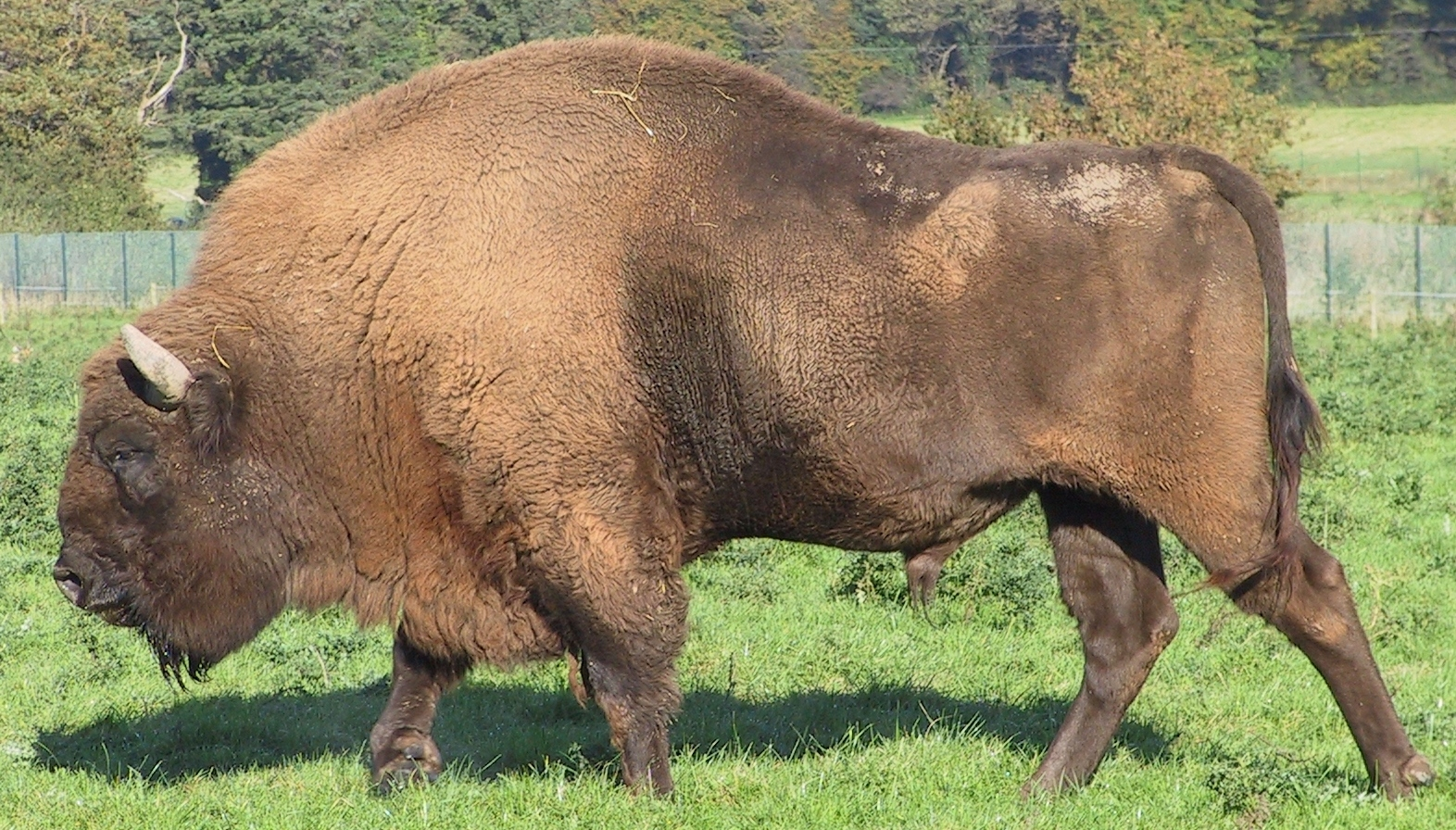
An adult European bison

Although they are superficially similar, the American and European bison exhibit a number of physical and behavioral differences. Adult American bison are slightly heavier on average because of their less rangy build and have shorter legs, which render them slightly shorter at the shoulder. American bison tend to graze more and browse less than their European relatives because their necks are set differently. Compared to the nose of the American bison, that of the European species is set farther forward than the forehead when the neck is in a neutral position. The body of the American bison is hairier, though its tail has less hair than that of the European bison. The horns of the European bison point forward through the plane of its face, making it more adept at fighting through the interlocking of horns in the same manner as domestic cattle, unlike the American bison, which favors charging. American bison are more easily tamed than the European and breed more readily with domestic cattle.

=== Crossbreeding with cattle ===
During the population bottleneck, after the great slaughter of American bison during the 19th century, the number of bison remaining alive in North America declined to as low as 541. During that period, a handful of ranchers gathered remnants of the existing herds to save the species from extinction. These ranchers bred some of the bison with cattle in an effort to produce "cattalo" or "beefalo". Accidental crossing was also known to occur. Generally, male domestic bulls were crossed with bison cows, producing offspring of which only the females were fertile. The crossbred animals did not demonstrate any form of hybrid vigor, so the practice was abandoned. The proportion of cattle DNA that has been measured in introgressed individuals and bison herds is typically quite low, ranging from 0.56 to 1.8%. Many claimed "beefalo", even those regarded as pedigree, have no detectable bison ancestry. In the United States, many ranchers use DNA testing to cull the residual cattle genetics from their bison herds. The U.S. National Bison Association has adopted a code of ethics which prohibits its members from deliberately crossbreeding bison with any other species.

== Range and population ==
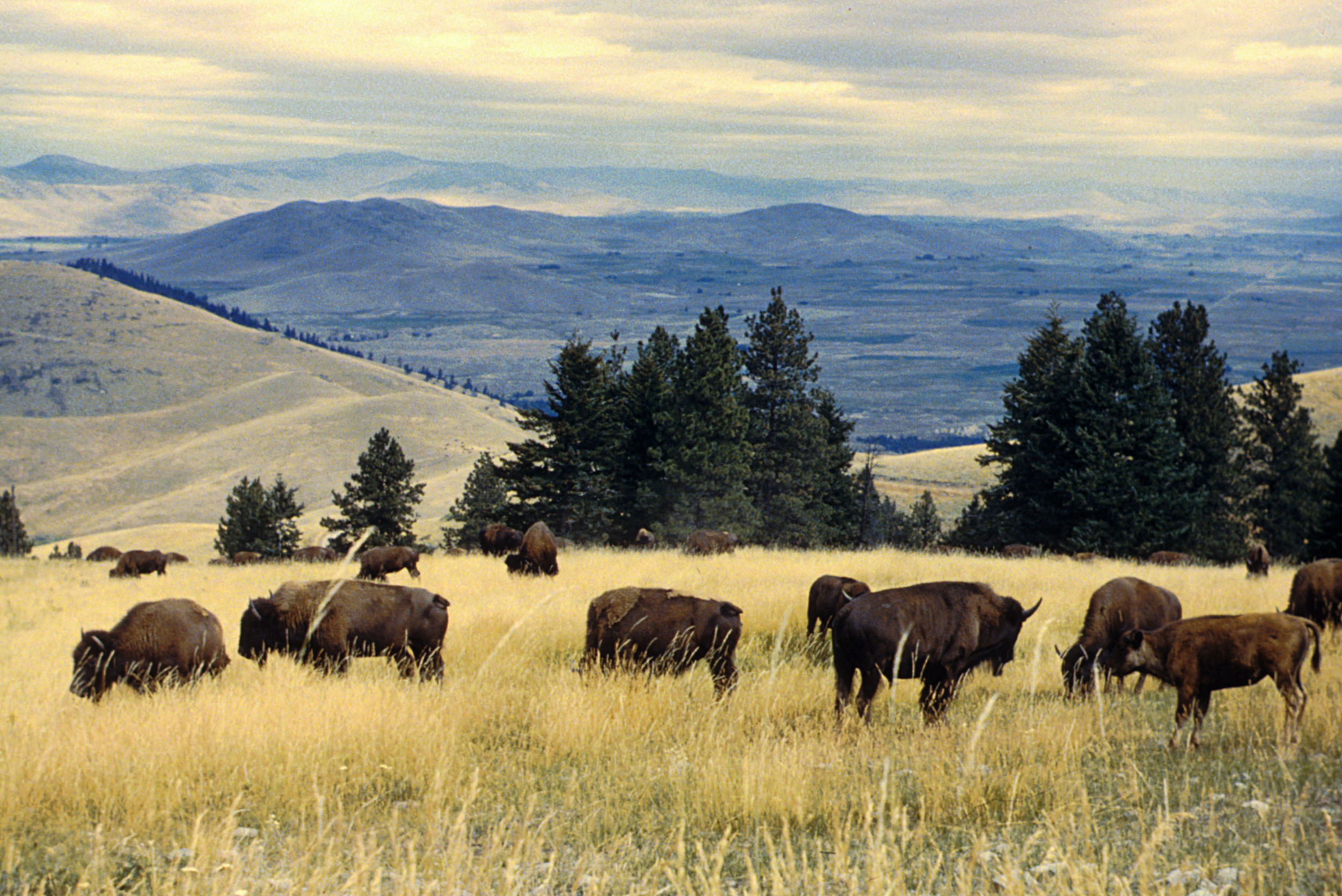
Bison herd grazing at the CSKT Bison Range in Montana

Population estimates in 2010 ranged from 400,000 to 500,000, with approximately 20,500 animals in 62 conservation herds and the remainder in approximately 6,400 commercial herds. According to the IUCN, roughly 15,000 bison are considered wild, free-range bison not primarily confined by fencing.

The Nature Conservancy (TNC) has reintroduced bison to over a dozen nature preserves around the United States. In October 2016, TNC established its easternmost bison herd in the country, at Kankakee Sands nature preserve in Morocco, Newton County, Indiana. In 2014, U.S. Tribes and Canadian First Nations signed a treaty to help with the restoration of bison, the first to be signed in nearly 150 years.

=== Habitat and trails ===
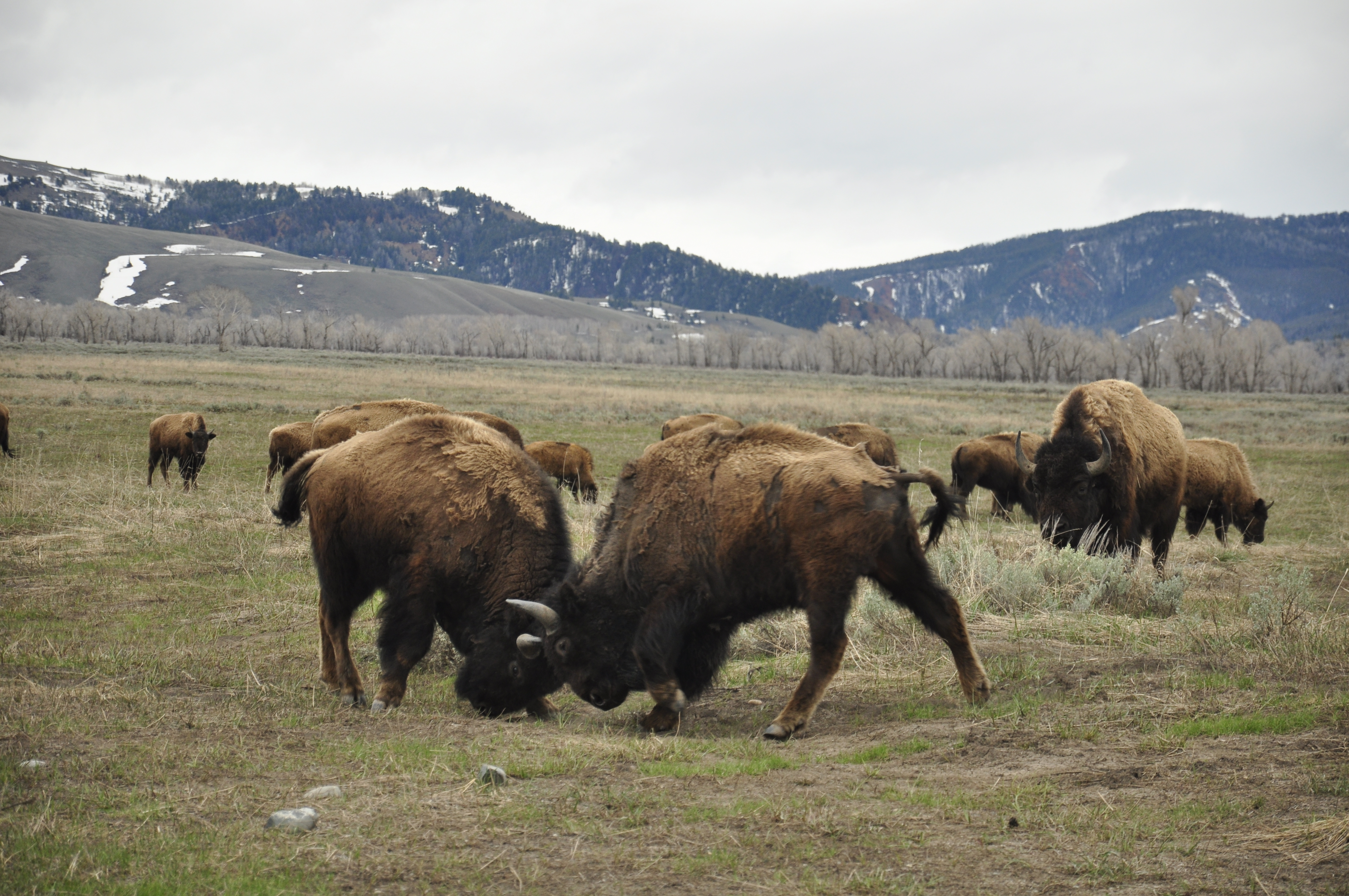
Bison sparring in Grand Teton National Park in Moose, Wyoming

American bison live in river valleys, and on prairies and plains. Typical habitat is open or semiopen grasslands, as well as sagebrush, semiarid lands, and scrublands. Some lightly wooded areas are also known historically to have supported bison. Bison also graze in hilly or mountainous areas where the slopes are not steep. Though not particularly known as high-altitude animals, bison in the Yellowstone Park bison herd are frequently found at elevations above 2,400 m (8,000 ft), and the Henry Mountains bison herd is found on the plains around the Henry Mountains, Utah, as well as in mountain valleys of the Henry Mountains to an altitude of 3,000 m (10,000 ft). Reintroduced plains bison in Banff National Park have been observed to roam mountainous areas, including high ridges and steep drainages. Archaeological finds indicate some bison spent their lives within mountain ranges while others may have migrated in and out.

Those in Yukon, Canada, typically summer in alpine plateaus above treeline. The first thoroughfares of North America, except for the time-obliterated paths of mastodon or muskox and the routes of the mound builders, were the traces made by bison and deer in seasonal migration and between feeding grounds and salt licks. Many of these routes, hammered by countless hoofs instinctively following watersheds and the crests of ridges in avoidance of lower places' summer muck and winter snowdrifts, and often following the routes of least resistance across rolling terrain, were followed by the aboriginal North Americans as routes to hunting grounds and as warriors' paths. They were invaluable to explorers and were adopted by pioneers.

Bison traces were characteristically north and south along seasonal migration routes, but several key east–west buffalo trails were used later as routes for railways. Some of these include the Cumberland Gap through the Blue Ridge Mountains to upper Kentucky. A heavily used trace crossed the Ohio River at the Falls of the Ohio and ran west, crossing the Wabash River near Vincennes, Indiana. In Senator Thomas Hart Benton's phrase saluting these sagacious path-makers, the bison paved the way for the railroads to the Pacific.

=== Mexico ===
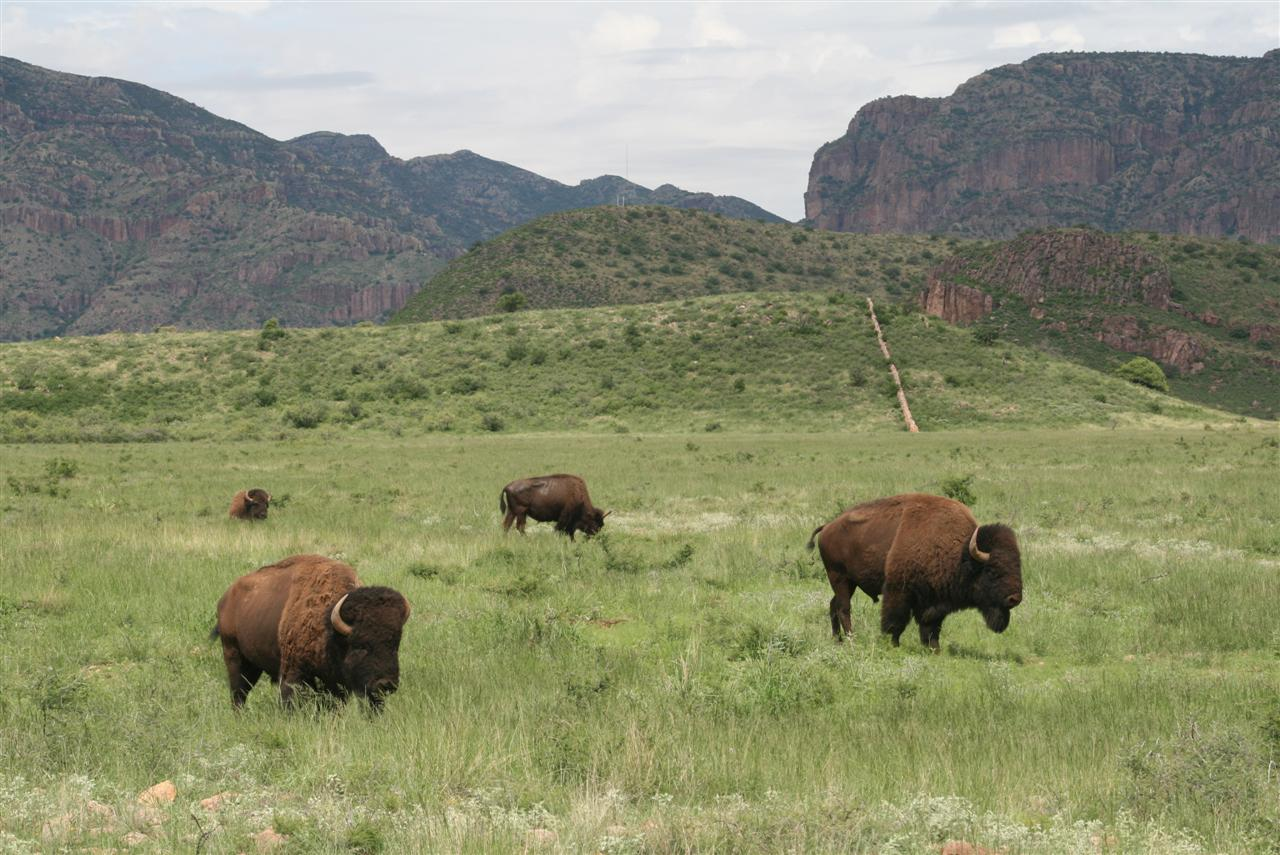
Bison herd grazing in Chihuahua, Mexico

The southern extent of the historic range of the American bison includes northern Mexico and adjoining areas in the United States as documented by archeological records and historical accounts from Mexican archives from 700 CE to the 19th century. The Janos-Hidalgo bison herd has ranged between Chihuahua, Mexico, and New Mexico, United States, since at least the 1920s. The persistence of this herd suggests that habitat for bison is suitable in northern Mexico. In 2009, genetically pure bison were reintroduced to the Janos Biosphere Reserve in northern Chihuahua adding to the Mexican bison population. In 2020, the second herd was formed in Maderas del Carmen. A private reserve named Jagüey de Ferniza has kept bison since before the above-mentioned reintroductions in Coahuila.

=== Introductions to Siberia ===
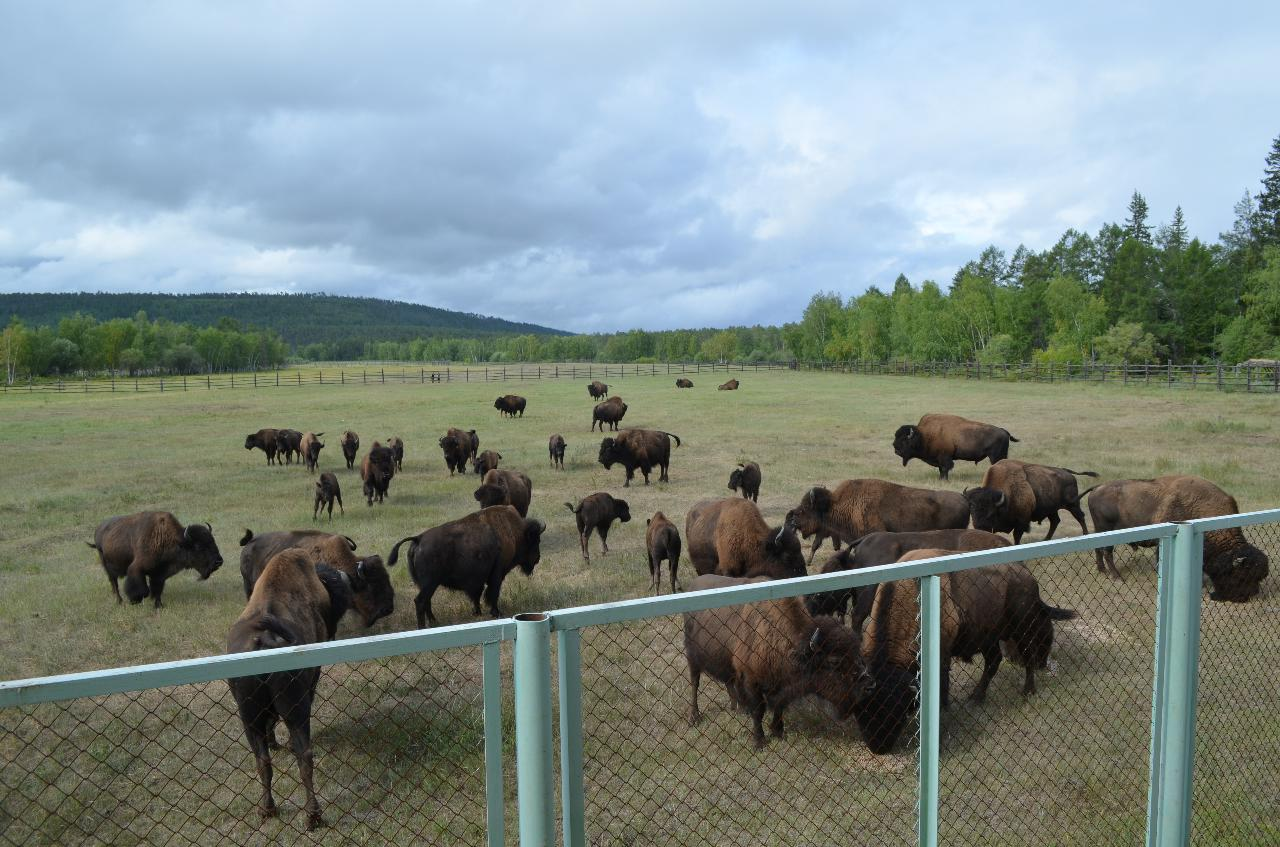
Wood bison introduction program in Sakha Republic

Since 2006, an outherd of wood bison sent from Alberta's Elk Island National Park was established in Yakutia, Russia as a practice of pleistocene rewilding; wood bison are the most similar to the extinct steppe bison species (Bison priscus sp.). The bison are adapting well to the cold climate, and Yakutia's Red List officially registered the species in 2019; a second herd was formed in 2020.

Plains bison were also translocated into the Pleistocene Park, as more-favored wood bison could not be acquired.

== Behavior and ecology ==
Grazing in winter, Yellowstone National Park: Bison use their heads to clear out snow for the grass

Bison are migratory and herd migrations can be directional as well as altitudinal in some areas. Bison have usual daily movements between foraging sites during the summer. In the Hayden Valley, Wyoming, bison have been recorded traveling, on average, 3 km (2 mi) per day. The summer ranges of bison appear to be influenced by seasonal vegetation changes, interspersion and size of foraging sites, the rut, and the number of biting insects. The size of preserve and availability of water may also be a factor. Bison are largely grazers, eating primarily grasses and sedges, turning to sagebrush and other non-graminoids in times of hardship. On shortgrass pasture, bison predominately consume warm-season grasses. On mixed prairie, cool-season grasses, including some sedges, apparently compose 79–96% of their diet. In montane and northern areas, sedges are selected throughout the year. Bison also drink water or consume snow on a daily basis.

=== Social behavior and reproduction ===
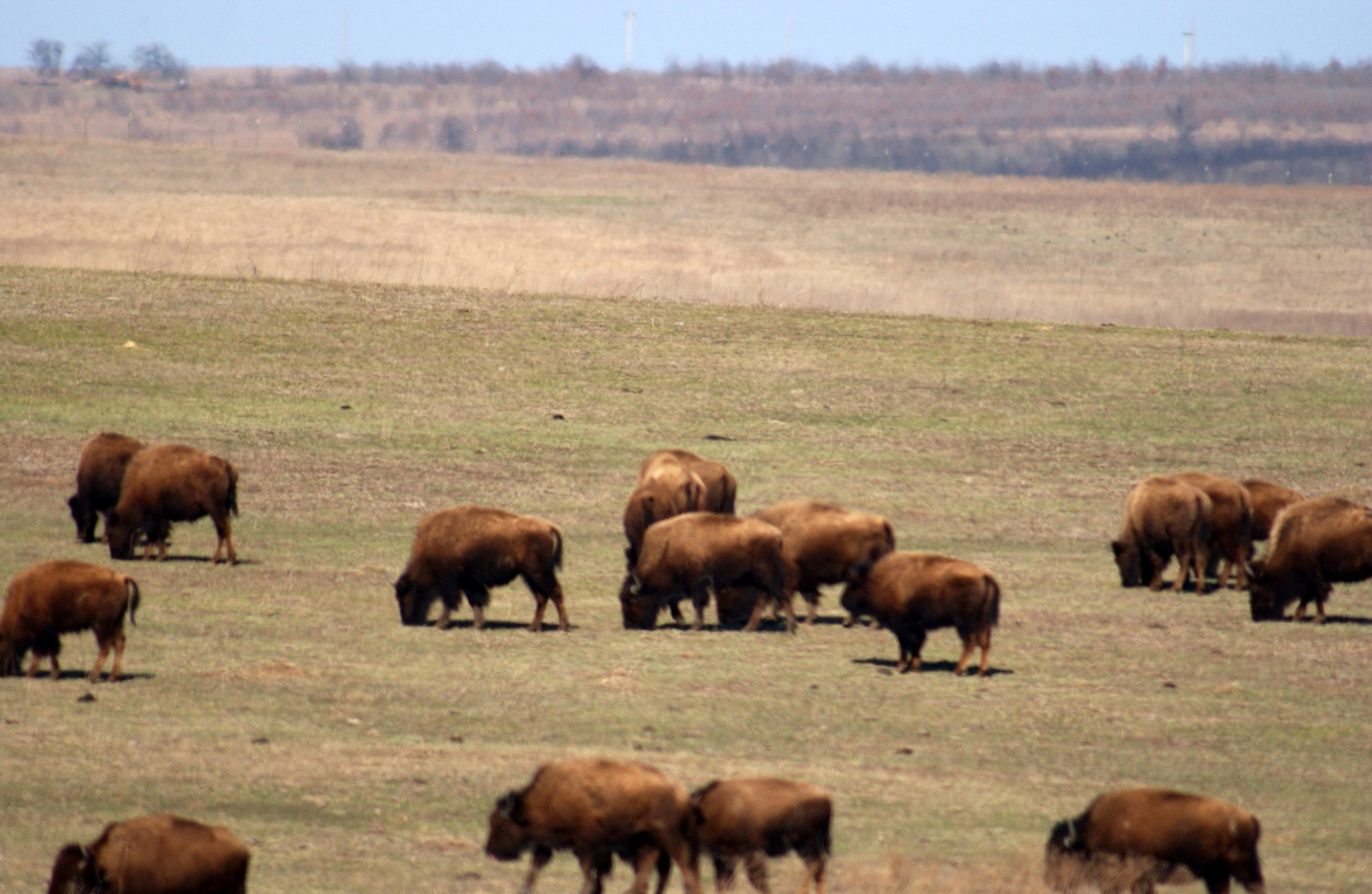
A herd of American bison grazing at Tall Grass Prairie Preserve in Osage County, Oklahoma

Female bison live in maternal herds which include other females and their offspring. Male offspring leave their maternal herd when around three years old and either live alone or join other males in bachelor herds. Male and female herds usually do not mingle until the breeding season, which can occur from July through September. However, female herds may also contain a few older males. During the breeding season, dominant bulls maintain a small harem of females for mating. Individual bulls "tend" cows until allowed to mate, by following them around and chasing away rival males. The tending bull shields the female's vision with his body so she will not see any other challenging males. A challenging bull may bellow or roar to get a female's attention, and the tending bull has to bellow or roar back. The most dominant bulls mate in the first 2–3 weeks of the season. More subordinate bulls mate with any remaining estrous cow that has not mated yet. Male bison play no part in raising the young.

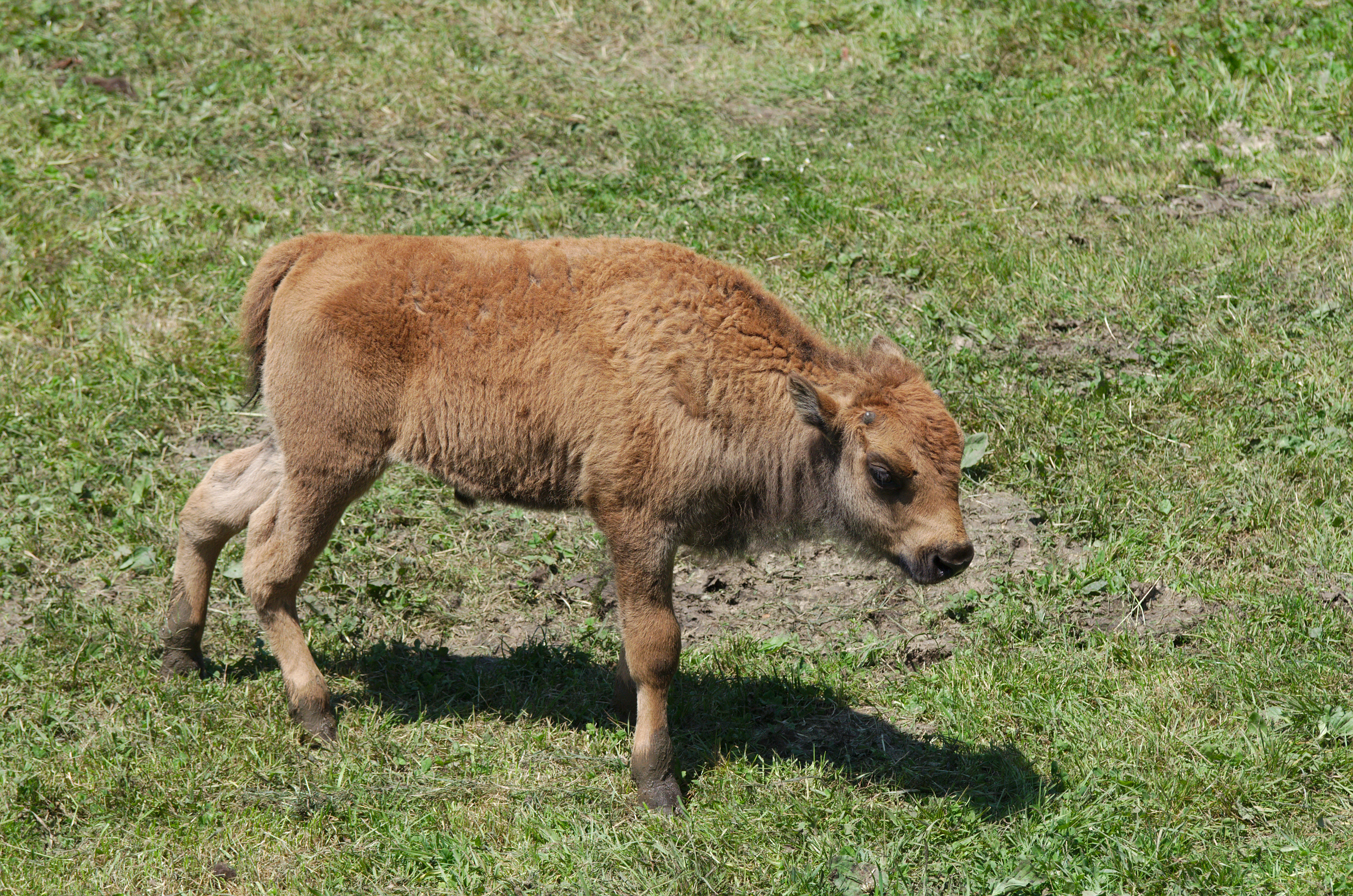
Calf

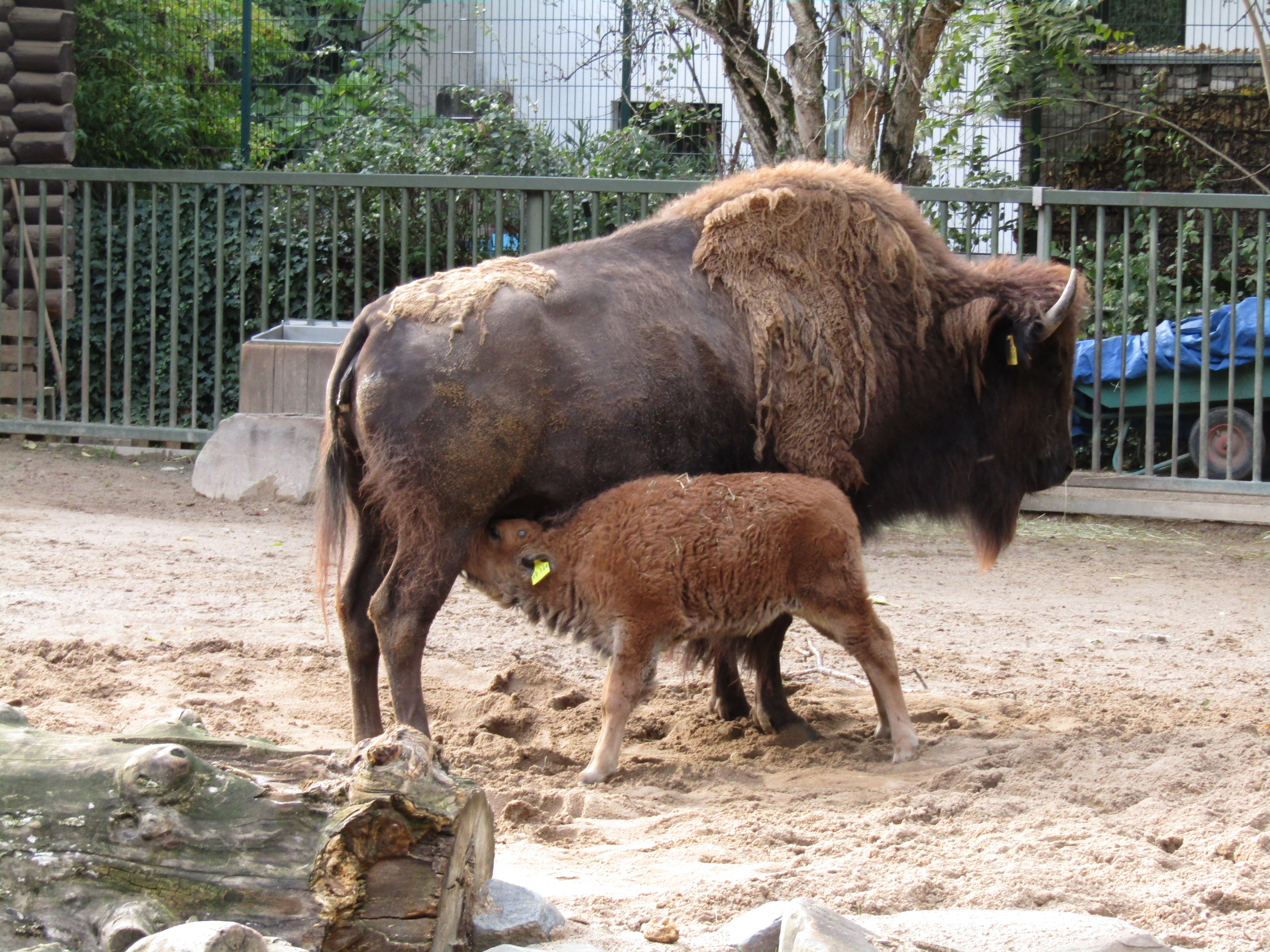
A cow suckling calf at the Cologne Zoological Garden in Cologne, Germany

Bison herds have dominance hierarchies that exist for both males and females. A bison's dominance is related to its birth date. Bison born earlier in the breeding season are more likely to be larger and more dominant as adults. Thus, bison are able to pass on their dominance to their offspring as dominant bison breed earlier in the season. In addition to dominance, the older bison of a generation also have a higher fertility rate than the younger ones.

Bison mate in August and September; gestation is 285 days. A single reddish-brown calf nurses until the next calf is born. If the cow is not pregnant, a calf will nurse for 18 months. Cows nurse their calves for at least 7 or 8 months, but most calves seem to be weaned before the end of their first year. At three years of age, bison cows are mature enough to produce a calf. The birthing period for bison in boreal biomes is protracted compared to that of other northern ungulates, such as moose and caribou.

Bison have a life expectancy around 15 years in the wild and up to 25 years in captivity. However, males and females from a hunted population also subject to wolf predation in northern Canada have been reported to live to 22 and 25 years of age, respectively.

Bison have been observed to display homosexual behaviors, males much more so than females. In the case of males, it is unlikely to be related to dominance, but rather to social bonding or gaining sexual experience.

=== Horning ===
Bison mate in late spring and summer in more open plain areas. During fall and winter, bison tend to gather in more wooded areas. During this time, bison partake in horning behaviors. They rub their horns against trees, young saplings, and even utility poles. Aromatic trees like cedars and pine seem to be preferred. Horning appears to be associated with insect defense, as it occurs most often in the fall when the insect population is at its highest. Cedar and pines emit an aroma after bison horn them and this seems to be used as a deterrent for insects.

=== Wallowing behavior ===
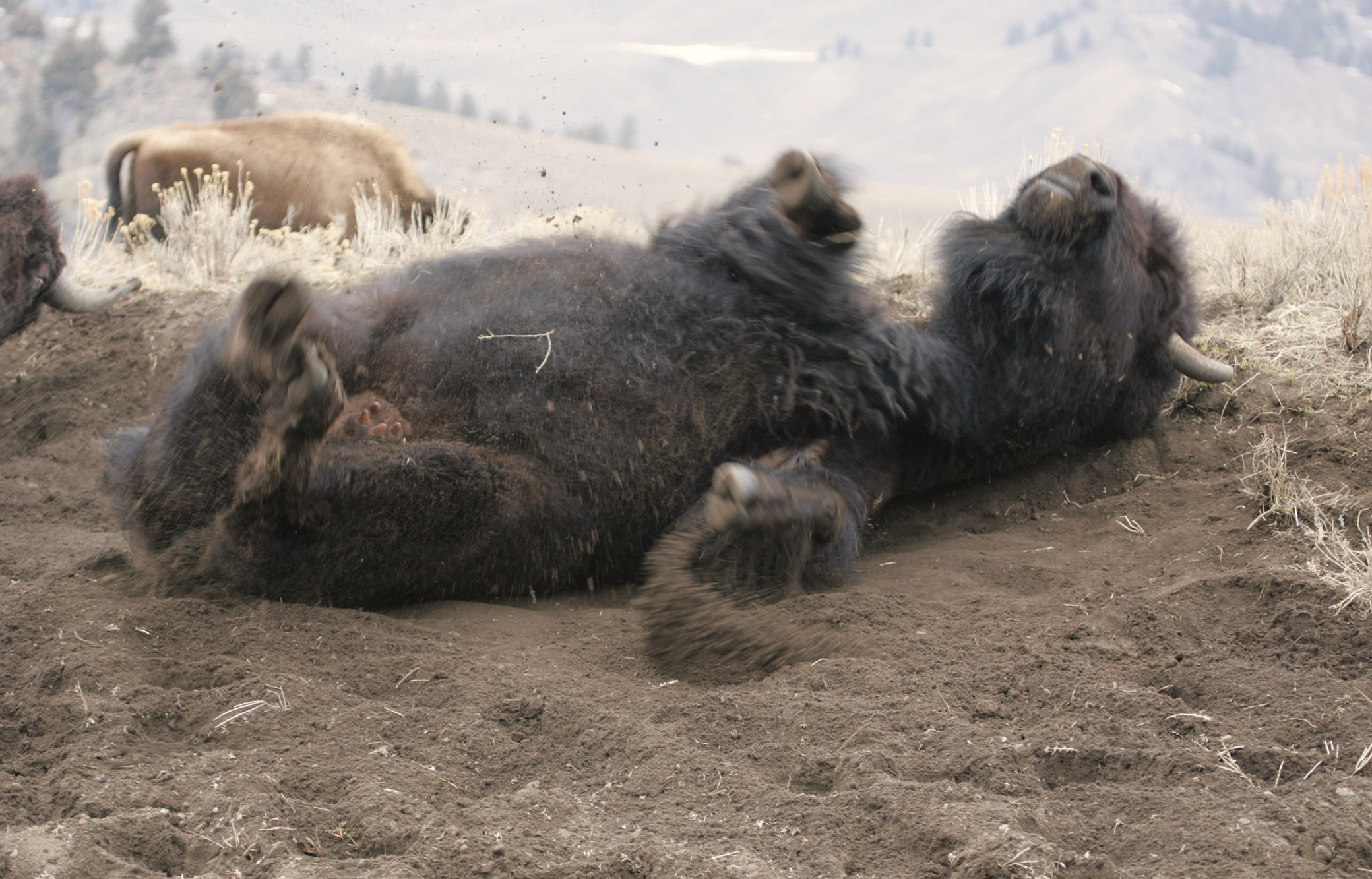
A bison wallowing on dirt near Lamar River Canyon

A bison wallow is a shallow depression in the soil, which bison use either wet or dry. Bison roll in these depressions, covering themselves with dust or mud. Past and current hypotheses to explain the purpose of wallowing include grooming associated with shedding, male-male interaction (typically rutting), social behavior for group cohesion, play, relief from skin irritation due to biting insects, reduction of ectoparasite (tick and lice) load, and thermoregulation. Bison wallowing has important ecosystem engineering effects and enhances plant and animal diversity on prairies.

=== Predation ===
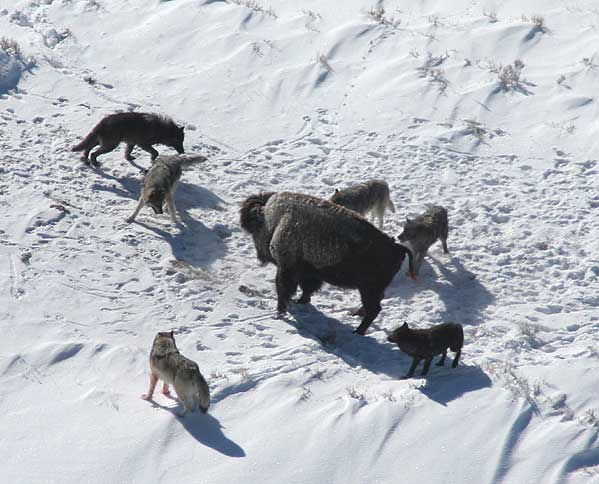
American bison standing its ground against a wolf pack

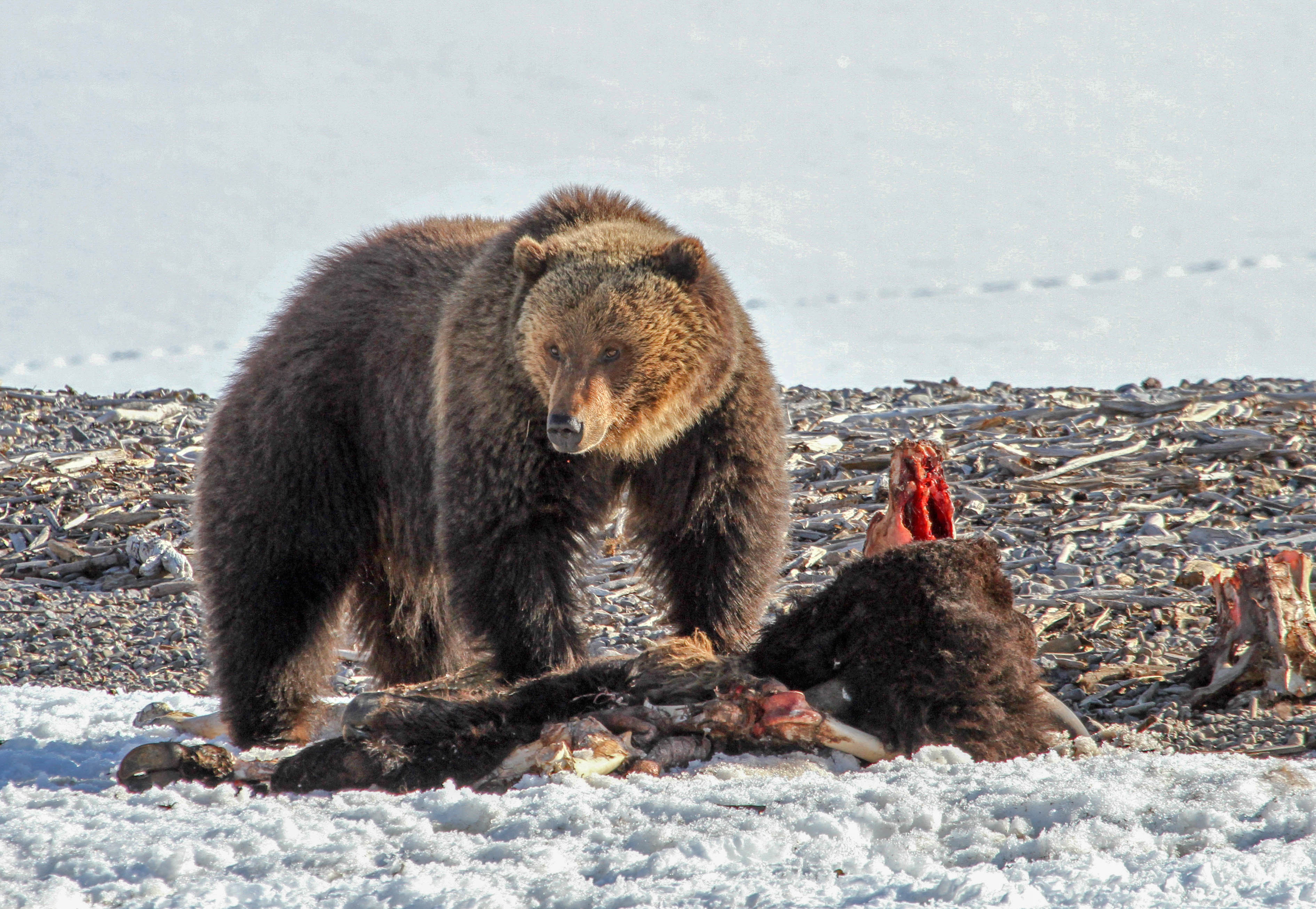
A grizzly bear feeding on an American bison carcass

While often secure from predation because of their size and strength, in some areas, vulnerable individuals are regularly preyed upon by wolves. Wolf predation typically peaks in late winter, when elk migrates south and bison are distressed with heavy snows and shortages of food sources, with attacks usually being concentrated on weakened and injured cows and calves. Wolves more actively target herds with calves than those without. The length of a predation episode varies, ranging from a few minutes to over nine hours. Bison calves use five apparent defense strategies in protecting themselves from wolves: running to a cow, running to a herd, running to the nearest bull, running in the front or center of a stampeding herd, and entering a lake or river or other body of water. When fleeing wolves in open areas, cows with young calves take the lead, while bulls take to the rear of the herds to guard the cows' escape. Bison typically ignore wolves not displaying hunting behavior. Wolf packs specializing in bison tend to have more males because their larger size than females allows them to wrestle prey to the ground more effectively. Healthy, mature bulls in herds rarely fall prey.

Grizzly bears are known to feed on carcass and may steal wolves' kills. Grizzlies can sometimes kill calves as well as old, injured, or sick adult bison, but direct killing of adult bison is rare even when grizzlies target lone and injured young individuals. Attacking a healthy bison is risky for a bear, who itself may be killed instead.

=== Dangers to humans ===
Bison are among the most dangerous animals encountered by visitors to the various North American national parks and will attack humans if provoked. They appear slow because of their lethargic movements but can easily outrun humans; bison have been observed running as fast as 65 to 70 km/h (40 to 45 mph). Bison may approach people for curiosity. Close encounters, including to touch the animals, can be dangerous, and gunshots do not startle them.

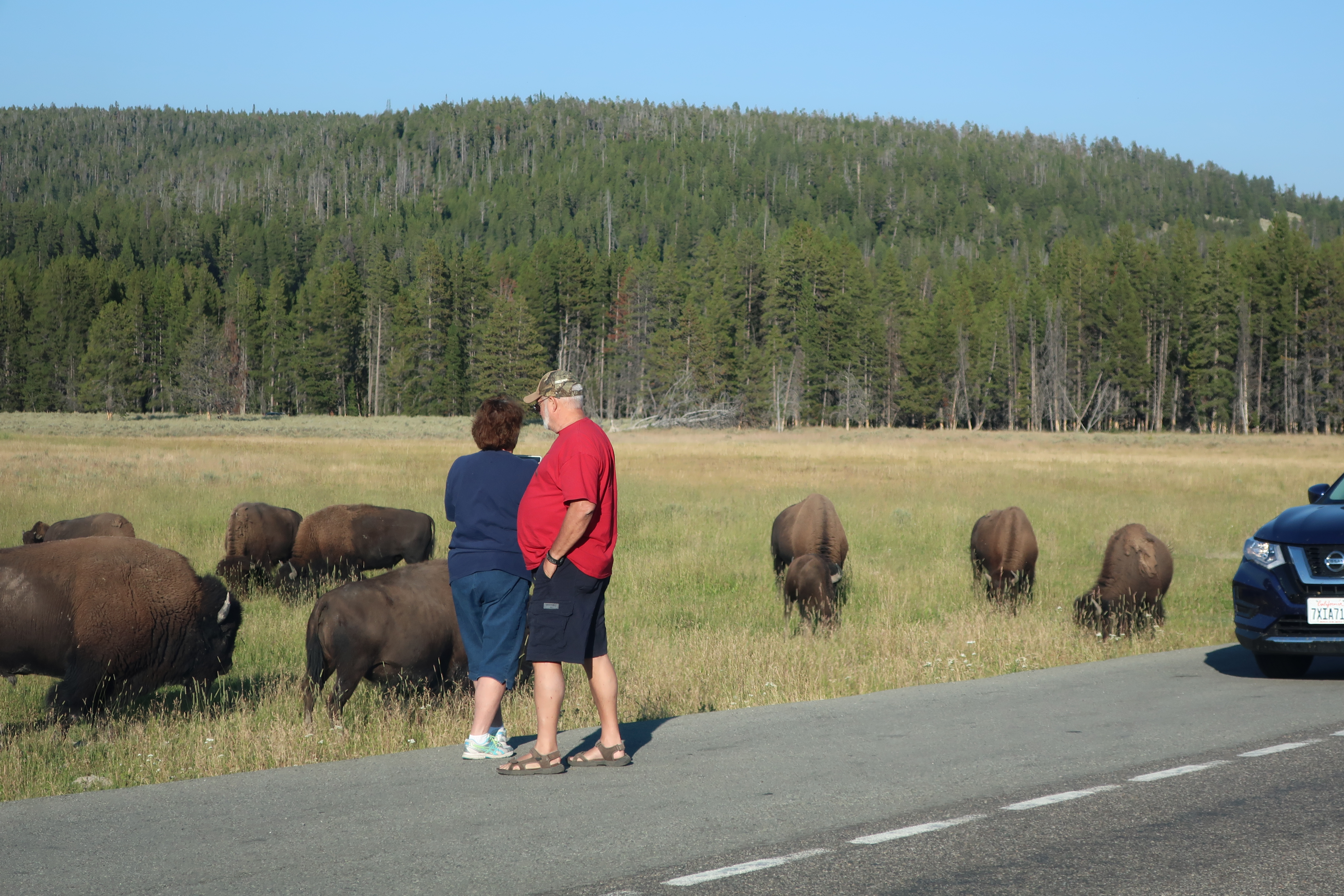
Tourists approach dangerously close to a wild herd of American bison to take a photograph in Yellowstone National Park, Wyoming

Between 1980 and 1999, more than three times as many people in Yellowstone National Park were injured by bison than by bears. During this period, bison charged and injured 79 people, with injuries ranging from goring puncture wounds and broken bones to bruises and abrasions. Bears injured 24 people during the same time. Three people died from the injuries inflicted—one person by bison in 1983, and two people by bears in 1984 and 1986.

== Genetics ==
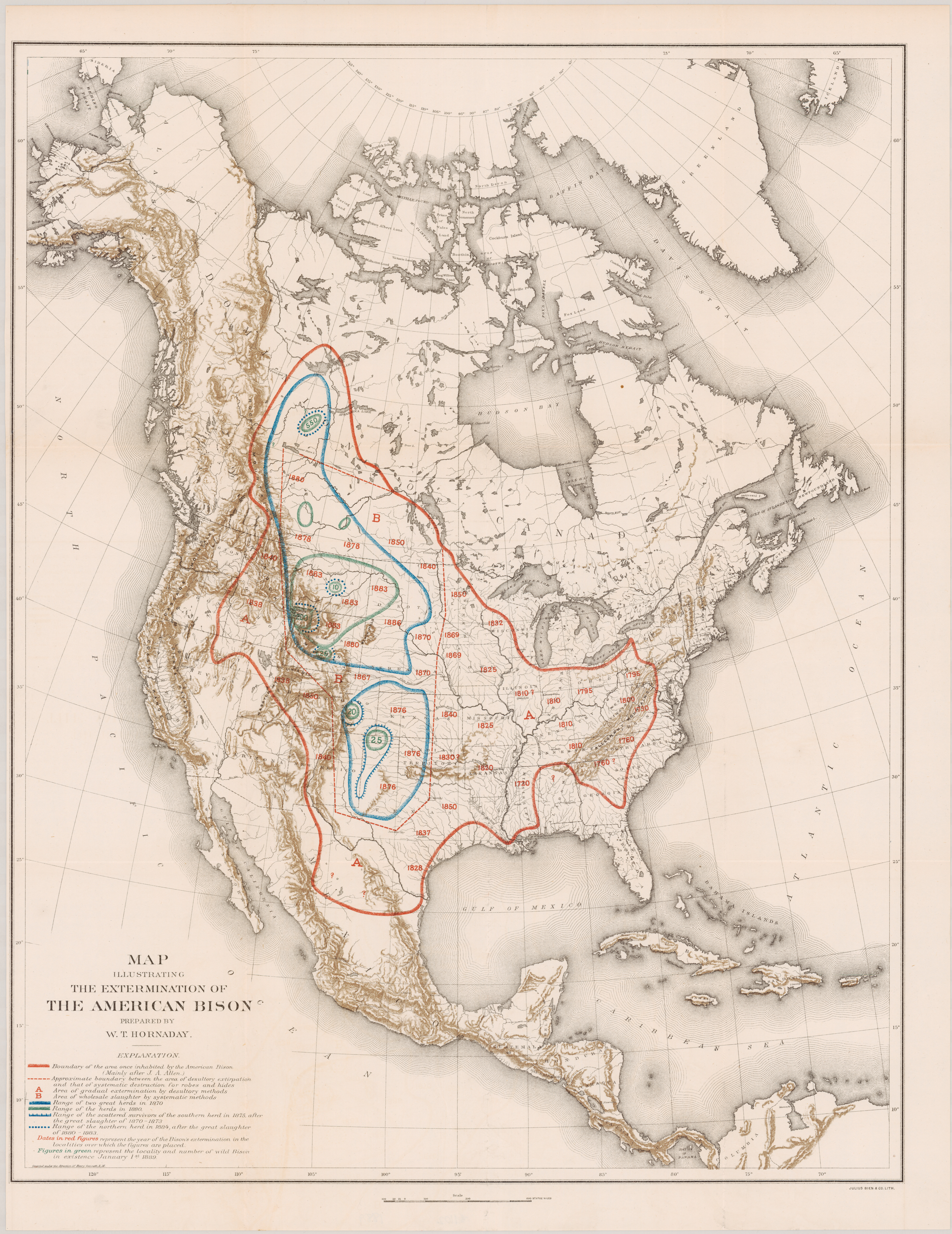
Map from 1889 by William Temple Hornaday, illustrating his book, The Extermination of the American Bison

A major problem faced by bison is a lack of genetic diversity due to the population bottleneck the species experienced during its near-extinction in the late 1800s. Another genetic issue is the entry of genes from domestic cattle into the bison population, through hybridization.

Officially, the "American buffalo" is classified by the United States government as a type of cattle, and the government allows private herds to be managed as such. This is a reflection of the characteristics that bison share with cattle. Though the American bison is a separate species and usually regarded as being in a separate genus from domestic cattle (Bos taurus), they have a lot of genetic compatibility with cattle. American bison can interbreed with cattle, although only the female offspring are fertile in the first generation. These female hybrids can be bred back to either bison or domestic bulls, resulting in either 1/4 or 3/4 bison young. Female offspring from this cross are also fertile, but males are not reliably fertile unless they are either 7/8 bison or 7/8 domestic. Moreover, when they do interbreed, crossbreed animals in the first generation tend to look very much like purebred bison, so appearance is completely unreliable as a means of determining which is a purebred bison, a crossbred cow and a crossbred bison. Many ranchers have deliberately crossbred their cattle with bison, and some natural hybridization could be expected in areas where cattle and bison occur in the same range. Since cattle and bison eat similar food and tolerate similar conditions, they have often been in the same range together in the past, and opportunity for crossbreeding may sometimes have been common.

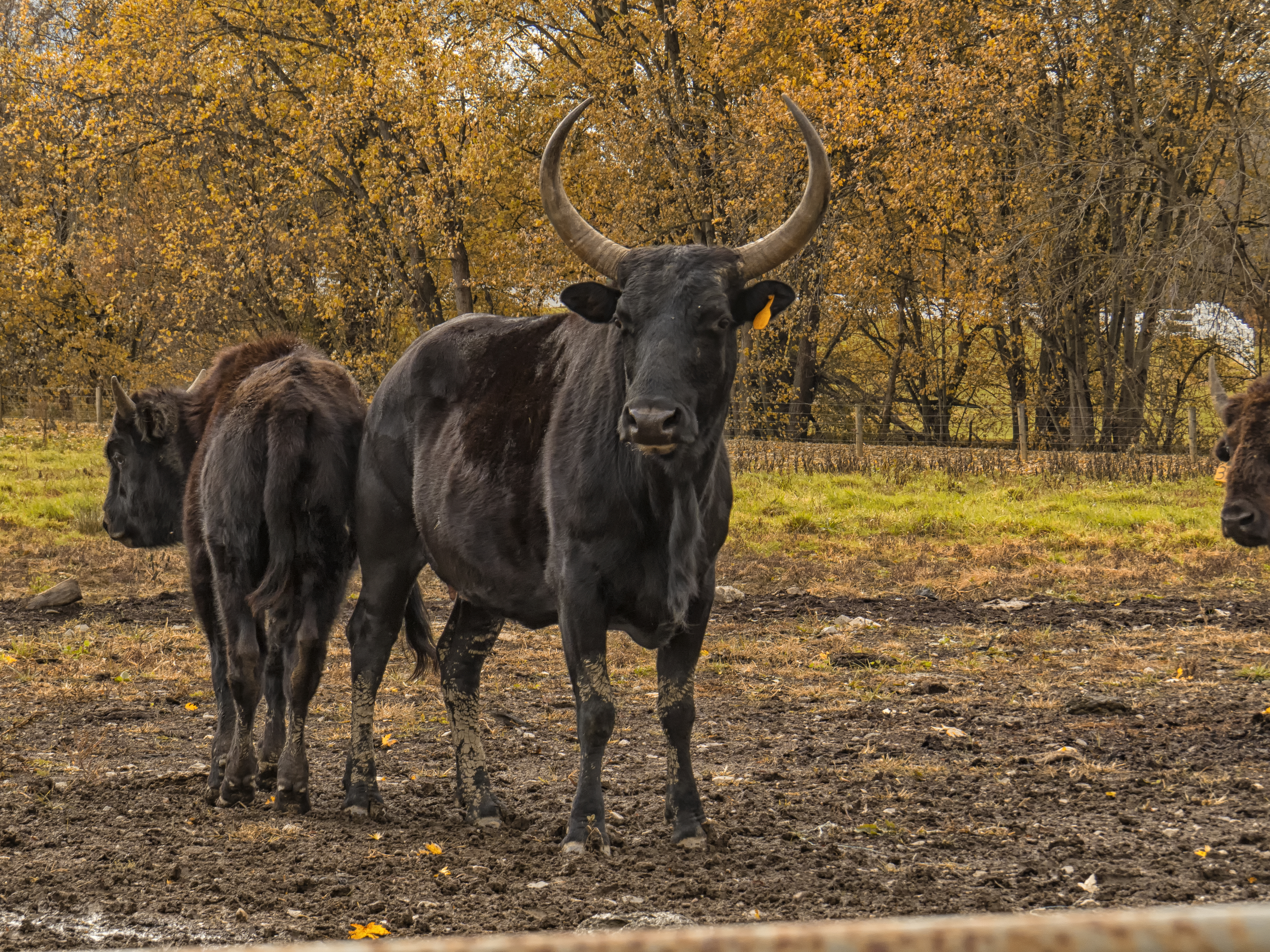
Hybrid between the domestic cow and the American bison

In recent decades, tests were developed to determine the source of mitochondrial DNA in cattle and bison, and most private "buffalo" herds were actually crossbred with cattle, and even most state and federal buffalo herds had some cattle DNA. With the advent of nuclear microsatellite DNA testing, the number of herds known to contain cattle genes has increased. As of 2011, though about 500,000 bison existed on private ranches and in public herds, perhaps only 15,000 to 25,000 of these bison were pure and not actually bison–cattle hybrids. DNA from domestic cattle (Bos taurus) has been found in almost all examined bison herds.

Significant public bison herds that do not appear to have hybridized domestic cattle genes are the Yellowstone Park bison herd, the Henry Mountains bison herd, which was started with bison taken from Yellowstone Park, the Wind Cave bison herd, and the Wood Buffalo National Park bison herd and subsidiary herds started from it, in Canada.

A landmark study of bison genetics performed by James Derr of Texas A&M University corroborated this. The Derr study was undertaken in an attempt to determine what genetic problems bison might face as they repopulate former areas, and it noted that bison seem to be adapting successfully, despite their apparent genetic bottleneck. One possible explanation for this might be the small number of domestic cattle genes in most bison populations, though this is not the only possible explanation for bison success.

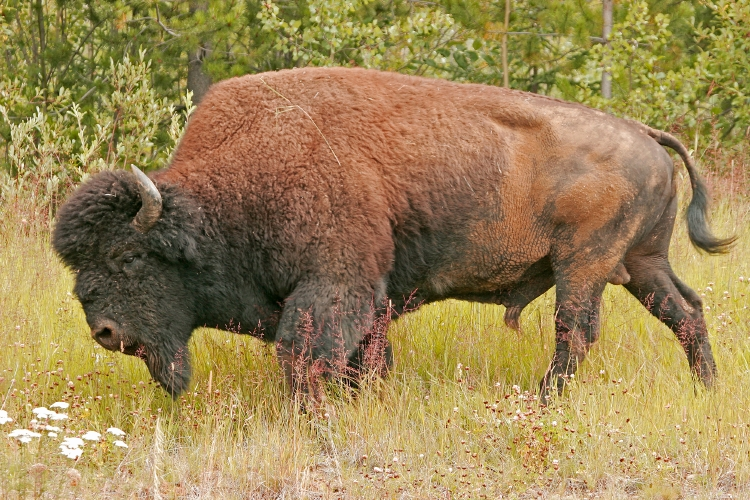
A wood bison around the Coal River in Canada

In the study, cattle genes were also found in small amounts throughout most national, state, and private herds. "The hybridization experiments conducted by some of the owners of the five foundation herds of the late 1800s, have left a legacy of a small amount of cattle genetics in many of our existing bison herds," said Derr. "All of the state owned bison herds tested (except for possibly one) contain animals with domestic cattle mtDNA."

It appears that the one state herd that had no cattle genes was the Henry Mountains bison herd; the Henry Mountain herd was started initially with transplanted animals from Yellowstone Park. However, the extension of this herd into the Book Cliffs of central Utah involved mixing the founders with additional bison from another source, so it is not known if the Book Cliffs extension of the herd is also free of cattle hybridization.

A separate study by Wilson and Strobeck, published in Genome, was done to define the relationships between different herds of bison in the United States and Canada, and to determine whether the bison at Wood Buffalo National Park in Canada and the Yellowstone Park bison herd were possibly separate subspecies. The Wood Buffalo Park bison were determined to actually be crossbreeds between plains and wood bison, but their predominant genetic makeup was that of the expected "wood buffalo". However, the Yellowstone Park bison herd was pure plains bison, and not any of the other previously suggested subspecies. Another finding was that the bison in the Antelope Island herd in Utah appeared to be more distantly related to other plains bison in general than any other plains bison group that was tested, though this might be due to genetic drift caused by the small size of only 12 individuals in the founder population. A side finding of this was that the Antelope Island bison herd appears to be most closely related to the Wood Buffalo National Park bison herd, though the Antelope Island bison are actually plains bison.

Range history of bison in North America

Original distribution of plains bison and wood bison in North America along the "great bison belt". Holocene bison (Bison occidentalis) is an earlier species at the origin of plains bison and wood bison.
Holocene bison
Wood bison
Plains bison

Map of the extermination of the bison to 1889. This map based on William Temple Hornaday's late-19th century research.
Original range
Range as of 1870
Range as of 1889

Distribution of public herds of plains bison and of free-ranging or captive breeding wood bison in North America as of 2003
Wood bison
Plains bison

In order to bolster the genetic diversity of the American bison, the National Park Service alongside the Department of the Interior announced the 2020 Bison Conservation Initiative on May 7, 2020. This initiative focuses on maintaining the genetic diversity of the metapopulation rather than individual herds. Small populations of bison are at considerably larger risk due to their decreased gene pool and are susceptible to catastrophic events more so than larger herds. The 2020 Bison Conservation Initiative aims to translocate up to three bison every five to ten years between the Department of the Interior's herds. Specific smaller herds will require a more intense management plan. Translocated bison will also be screened for any health defects such as infection of brucellosis bacteria as to not put the larger herd at risk.

== Population bottleneck and near extinction ==
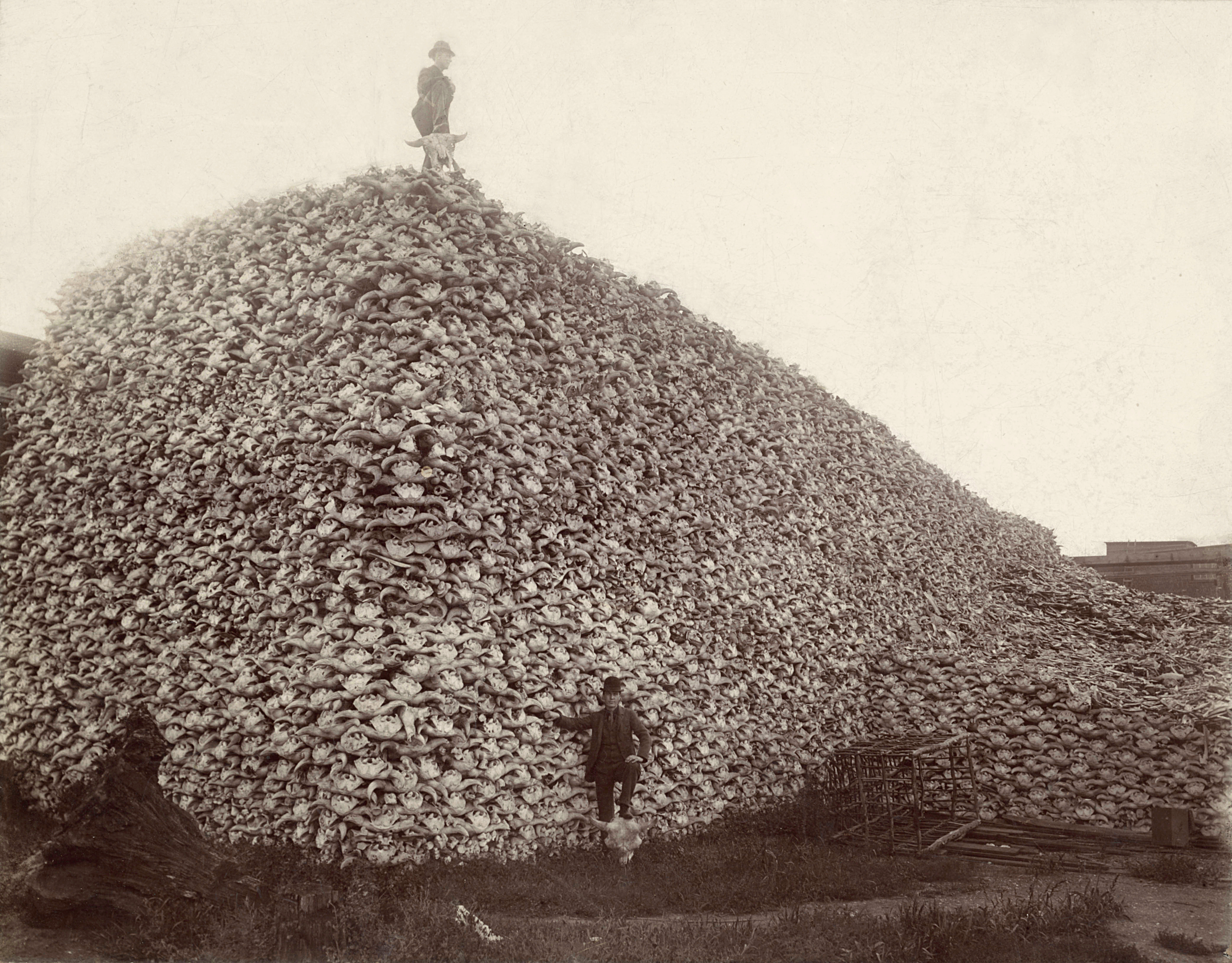
A pile of American bison skulls waiting to be ground for fertilizer, mid-1870s

Bison went from numbering an estimated 60 million individuals (Note: The 60 million estimation is based on an observation made by Colonel R.I. Dodge along the Arkansas River in Kansas in 1871.) before the 1870s to becoming nearly extinct in the 1880s. This was due to the mass slaughtering of bison during the 1870s, which caused the plains bison population to undergo a population bottleneck. The bottleneck resulted in a founding population of plains bison around 100 individuals, split into six herds, five of which were managed by private ranchers and one managed by the New York Zoological Park (now the Bronx Zoo). Additionally, a wild herd consisting of 25 individuals in Yellowstone National Park survived the bottleneck.

Mass killings of bisons was described as "a form of biocide in service of genocide" and "part of the campaign to ethnically cleanse Native Americans from the land".

Each of the privately ranched herds had an initial effective population size (N_{e}) of an estimated 5 to 7 individuals, for a total combined effective population size of between 30 and 50 individuals, from which all of the modern plains bison descend. While these herds have remained mostly isolated, some more than others, there has been some interbreeding between the herds over the past 150 years.

The conservation efforts and copious amounts of data taken on American bison populations allow for American bison to serve as a useful study case of population bottlenecking and its effects. This is especially true of the Texas State Bison Herd, which underwent very extreme genetic bottlenecking, with a founding population of only 5 individuals.

=== Texas State Bison Herd ===
The Texas State Bison Herd (TSBH), also known as the Goodnight herd, was established by Charles Goodnight in the mid-1880s with five wild-caught calves. In 1887, the herd consisted of 13 individuals; in 1910, the population consisted of 125 individuals; and in the 1920s, the population ranged from 200 to 250 individuals. In 1929, Goodnight died and the herd switched hands multiple times, leaving the population of the herd unknown from 1930 until the herd was donated to the State of Texas in 1997, with a population of 36 individuals, solely descended from the original five calves. By 2002, the population of the TSBH consisted of 40 individuals and had concerningly low birth rates and high rates of calf mortality. This led to extra attention being given to this herd by conservationists who then performed significant amounts of genetic testing.

Goodnight was an advocate for the hybridization of bison with cattle, in the hopes of creating a stronger and healthier breed. When the herd was donated to the State of Texas, genetic testing revealed that 6 out of 36 individuals still carried cattle mitochondrial DNA.

Researchers found that the average number of alleles per locus and the heterozygosity levels (a measure of genetic diversity, where high heterozygosity is representative of high genetic diversity) for the TSBH were significantly lower than that of the Yellowstone National Park bison population and the Theodore Roosevelt National Park bison population. Additionally, of the 54 nuclear microsatellites that were examined, the TSBH had 8 monomorphic loci (i.e., each loci had only one allele), whereas in both the Yellowstone and Theodore Roosevelt herds there was only one monomorphic locus, indicating a much lower level of genetic diversity in the TSBH. The Yellowstone herd had an average number of alleles per locus of 4.75, the Theodore Roosevelt National Park herd had an average of 4.15 alleles per locus, but the TSBH only had an average of 2.54 alleles per locus, statistically significantly lower than the others. The heterozygosity level of the Yellowstone, Theodore Roosevelt, and TSBH populations were 0.63, 0.57, and 0.38 respectively, with the TSBH again having a statistically significantly lower value. This low genetic diversity found in TSBH is likely due to the critically low starting population, several additional bottlenecks throughout the herd's history–leading to inbreeding depression–, and a continuously low population allowing for genetic drift to have a large effect. Before any addition of new individuals, the rate of loss of genetic diversity was estimated to be between 30 and 40% over the proceeding 50 years.

The inbreeding depression resulting from the multiple extreme population bottlenecks in the TSBH led to a coefficient of inbreeding of 0.367, equal to the level of inbreeding that results from two generations of full-siblings mating.

The Texas State Bison Herd is also a useful example of the deleterious effects of extreme population bottlenecking, with an average natality rate of 0.376 offspring per female and a 1st-year mortality rate of 52.6% from 1997 to 2002, compared to an average natality rate of 0.560 offspring per female and a 1st-year mortality rate of 4.2% for the other bison herds.

Additionally, if it were not for the intervention of conservationists, the Texas State Bison Herd would have most likely gone extinct, as the population bottleneck would have proven to be too severe. Multiple population models based on the genetics of the TSBH in the early 2000s predicted a 99% chance of extinction of the TSBH in less than 50 years, with an estimation in 2004 giving the TSBH a 99% chance of extinction in 41 years without the introduction of any outside individuals (Halbert et al. 2004). Importantly for conservation, another simulation predicted that the addition of multiple (3–9) outside male bison into the herd would increase genetic diversity enough to give the herd a 100% chance of surviving for another 100 years.

Conservation efforts have led the current TSBH population to be at the carrying capacity of their habitat, at around 300 individuals.

=== Yellowstone National Park Bison Herd ===
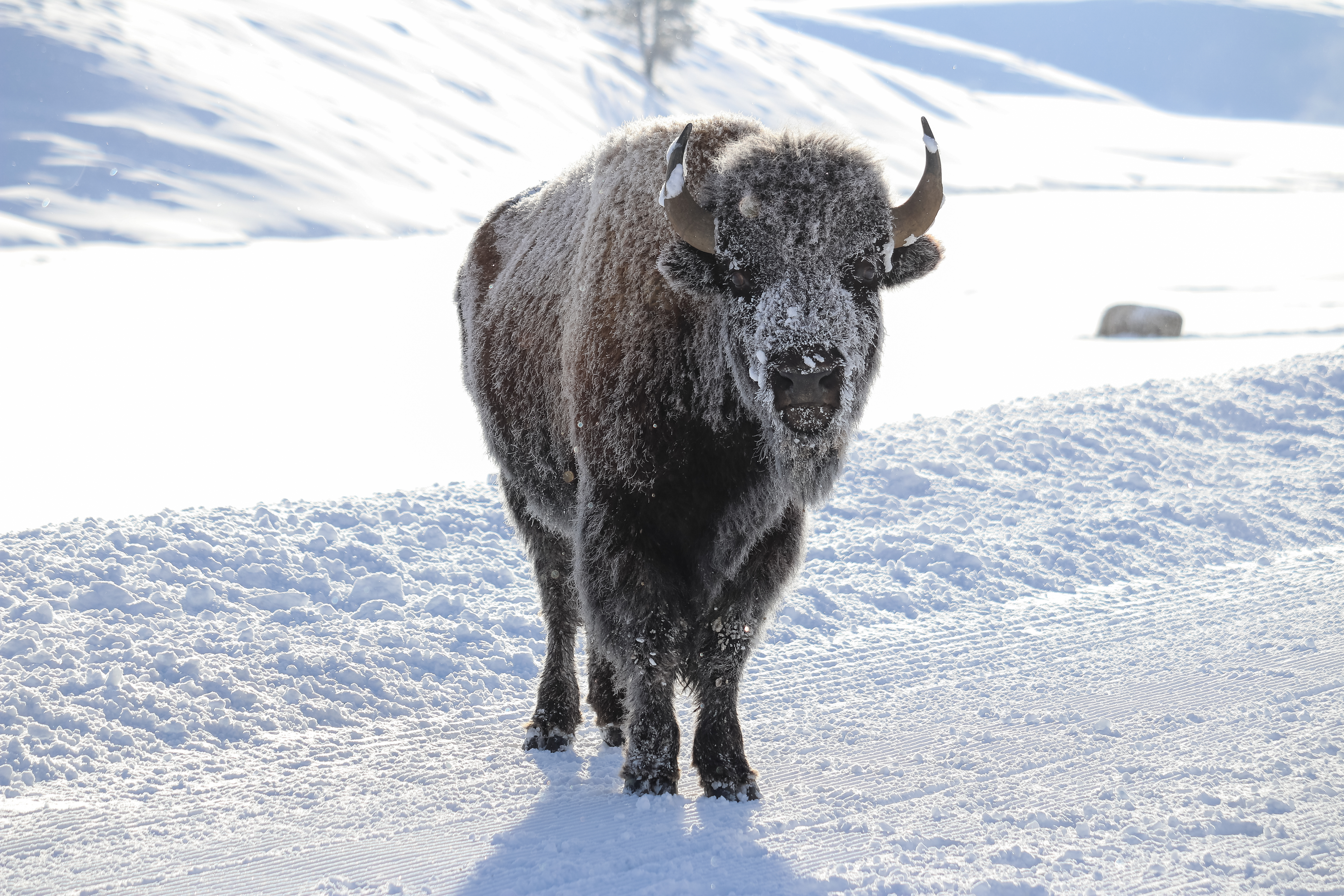
Bison in winter in Hayden Valley

The Yellowstone bison herd in Yellowstone National Park started with only 25 individuals, and there was evidence of two population bottlenecking events from 1896 to 1912, with a population ranging between 25 and 50 individuals during this time. In 1902, 18 female and 3 male bison from outside herds–the Pablo-Allard herd and Goodnight (TSBH) herds respectively–were introduced to the Yellowstone herd. After the addition of those individuals, the effective population size is estimated to have been N_{e}=7.2 individuals. The Yellowstone herd was kept completely isolated from 1902 to around 1920, and these previously mentioned founders contributed between 60 and 70% of the genetics of the current bison population at Yellowstone.

Similar to the Texas State Bison Herd, the introduction of new individuals into the population in 1902 likely was the savior of this herd, which now numbers around 5,900 individuals as of summer 2022.

=== Population recovery ===
From the late 19th century onwards, the bison population gradually rose from 325 in 1884 to 500,000 in 2017, as a result of careful preservation and a general population boom. Although they are no longer classified as endangered, there are still conservation efforts in order to prevent population crashes down the line.

== Hunting ==
Year	American bison (est)
Pre-1800	60,000,000
1830	40,000,000
1840	35,650,000
1870	5,500,000
1880	395,000
1889	541 (U.S.)
1900	300 (U.S.)
1944–47	5,000 (U.S.)
1944–47	15,000 (Canada)
1951	23,340
2000	c. 30,000
2017	500,000

Buffalo hunting, i.e. hunting of the American bison, was an activity fundamental to the Indigenous peoples of the Great Plains, providing more than 150 uses for all parts of the animal, including being a major food source, hides for clothing and shelter, bones and horns as tools as well as ceremonial and adornment uses. Bison hunting was later adopted by American professional hunters, as well as by the U.S. government, in an effort to sabotage the central resource of some American Indian Nations during the later portions of the American Indian Wars, leading to the near-extinction of the species around 1890. For many tribes the buffalo was an integral part of life—something guaranteed to them by the Creator. In fact, for some Plains indigenous peoples, bison are known as the first people. The concept of species extinction was foreign to many tribes.

Thus, when the U.S. government began to massacre the buffalo, it was particularly harrowing to the Indigenous people. As Crow chief Plenty Coups described it: "When the buffalo went away the hearts of my people fell to the ground, and they could not lift them up again. After this nothing happened. There was little singing anywhere." Spiritual loss was rampant; bison were an integral part of traditional tribal societies, and they would frequently take part in ceremonies for each bison they killed to honor its sacrifice. In order to boost morale during this time, Sioux and other tribes took part in the Ghost Dance, which consisted of hundreds of people dancing until 100 persons were lying unconscious.

Many conservation measures have been taken by Native Americans, with the Inter Tribal Bison Council being one of the most significant. Formed in 1990, it comprises 56 tribes in 19 states. These tribes represent a collective herd of more than 15,000 bison and focus on reestablishing herds on tribal lands in order to promote culture, revitalize spiritual solidarity, and restore the ecosystem. Some Inter Tribal Bison Council members argue that the bison's economic value is one of the main factors driving its resurgence. Bison serve as a low-cost substitute for cattle, and they can withstand the winters in the Plains region far easier than cattle.

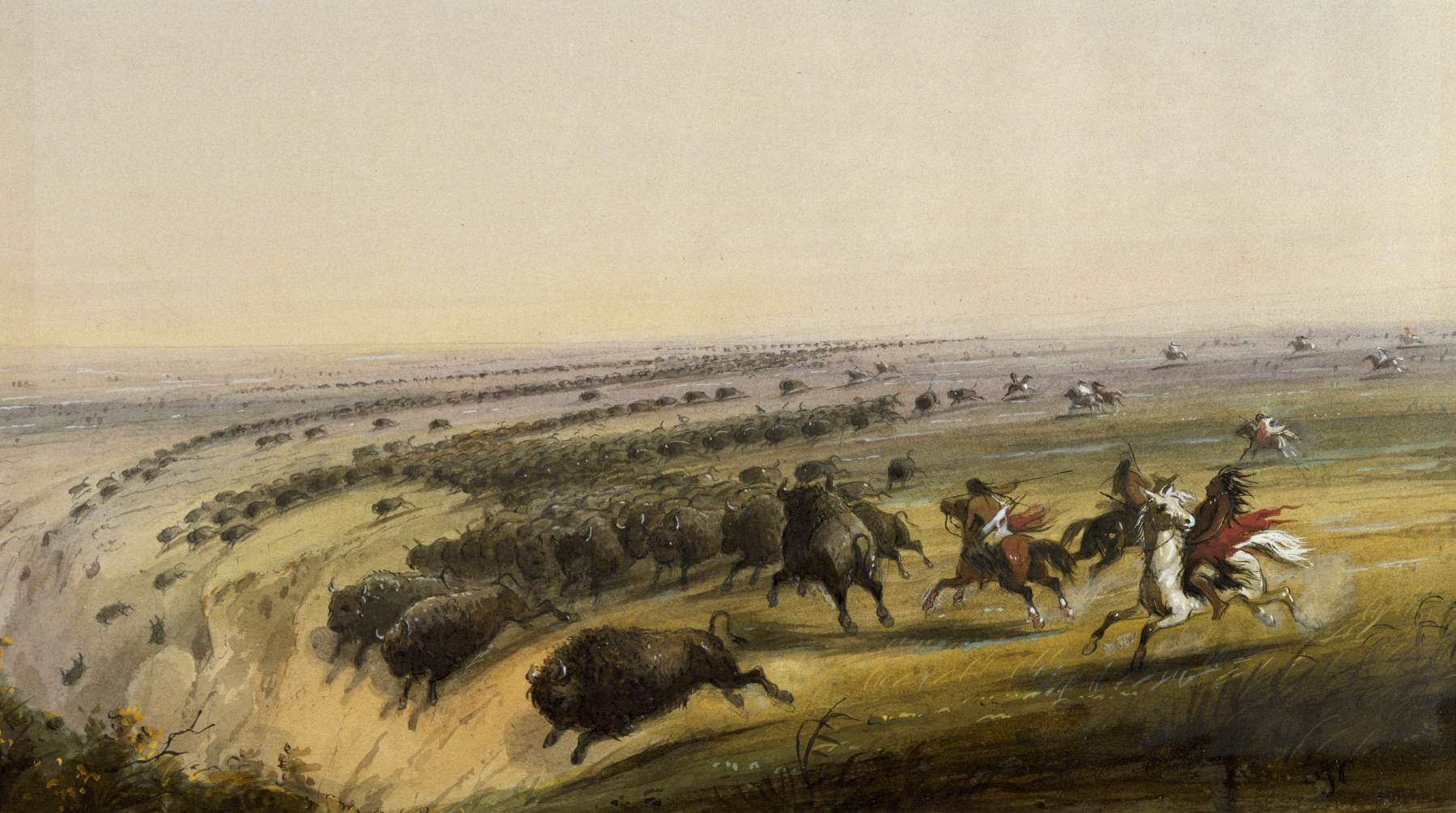
Bison being chased off a cliff as painted by Alfred Jacob Miller

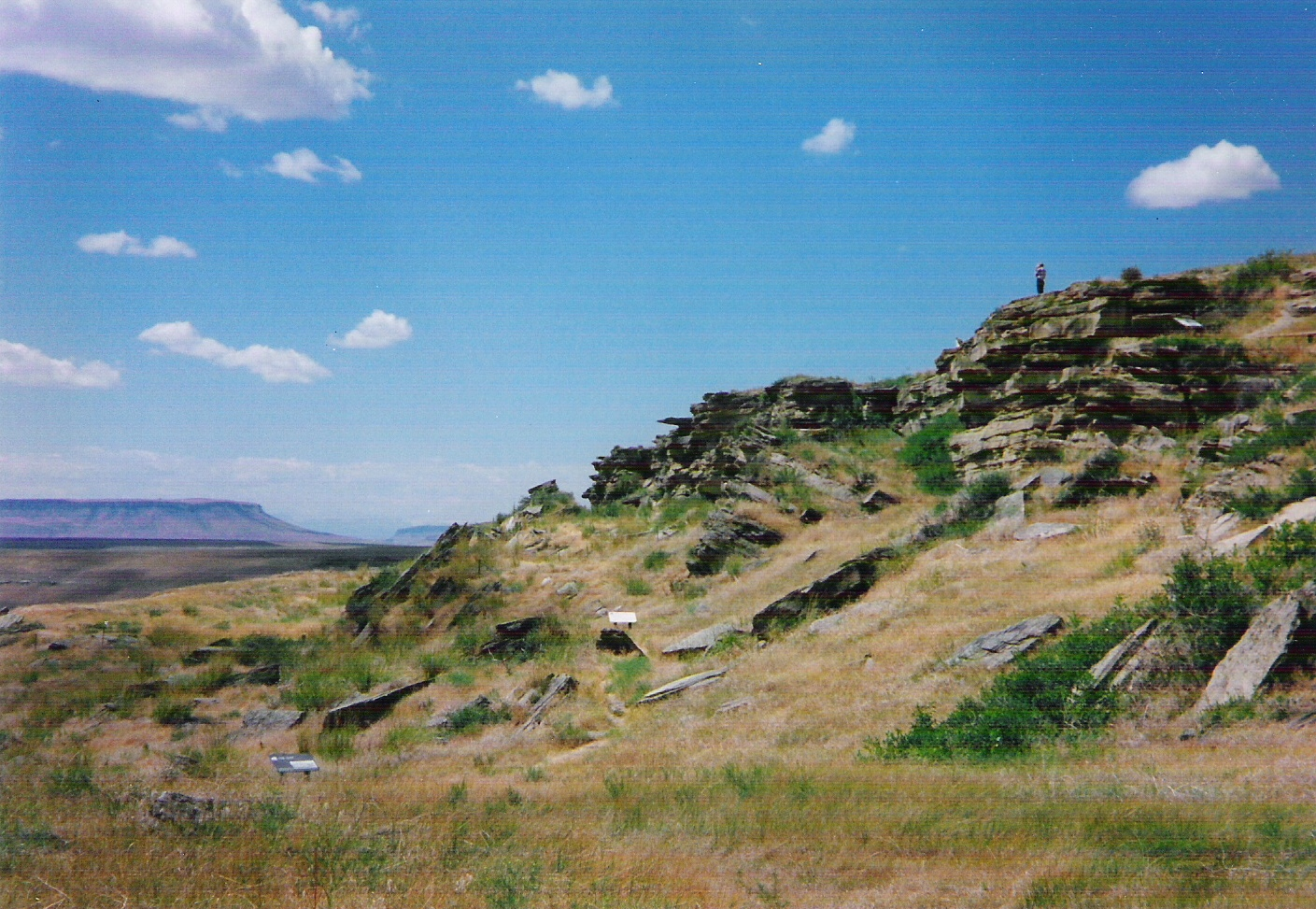
Ulm Pishkun. Buffalo jump, SW of Great Falls, Montana. The Blackfoot drove bison over cliffs in the autumn to secure the winter supply. The Blackfoot used pishkuns as late as the 1850s.

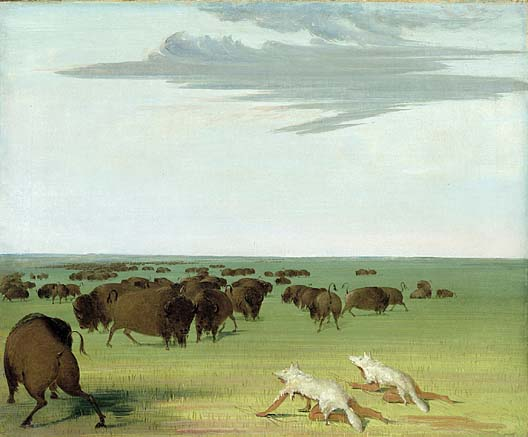
Bison hunt under the wolf-skin mask, 1832–33

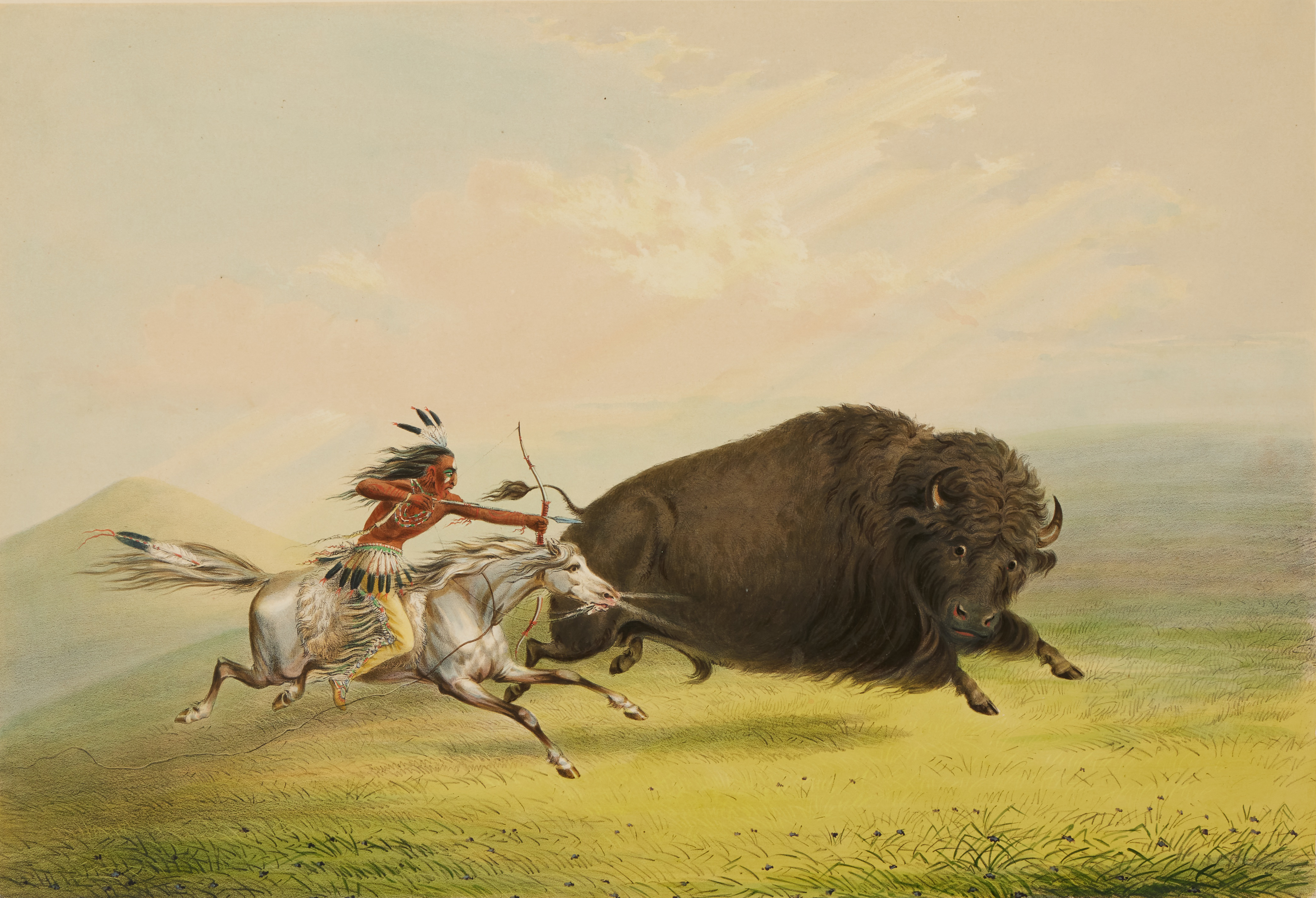
A bison hunt depicted by George Catlin

== As livestock ==
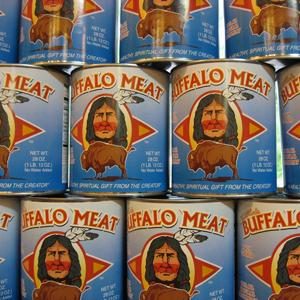
Canned bison meat for sale

Bison are increasingly raised for meat, hide, wool, and dairy products. The majority of American bison in the world are raised for human consumption or fur clothing. Bison meat is generally considered to taste very similar to beef, but is lower in fat and cholesterol, yet higher in protein than beef, which has led to the development of beefalo, a fertile hybrid of bison and domestic cattle. In 2005, about 35,000 bison were processed for meat in the U.S., with the National Bison Association and USDA providing a "Certified American Buffalo" program with birth-to-consumer tracking of bison via RFID ear tags. There is kosher bison meat; these bison are slaughtered at one of the few kosher mammal slaughterhouses in the U.S., and the meat is then distributed nationwide.

Bison are found in publicly and privately held herds. Custer State Park in South Dakota is home to 1,500 bison, one of the largest publicly held herds in the world, but some question the genetic purity of the animals. Wildlife officials believe that free roaming herds with minimal cattle introgression on public lands in North America can be found only in: the Yellowstone Park bison herd; the Henry Mountains bison herd at the Book Cliffs and Henry Mountains in Utah; at Wind Cave National Park in South Dakota; Fort Peck Indian Reservation in Montana; Mackenzie Bison Sanctuary in the Northwest Territories; Elk Island National Park and Wood Buffalo National Park in Alberta; Grasslands National Park and Prince Albert National Park in Saskatchewan.

Another population, the Antelope Island bison herd on Antelope Island in Utah, consisting of 550 to 700 bison, is also one of the largest and oldest public herds in the United States, but the bison in that herd are considered to be only semifree roaming, since they are confined to the Antelope Island. In addition, recent genetic studies indicate that, like most bison herds, the Antelope Island bison herd has a small number of genes from domestic cattle. In 2002, the United States government donated some bison calves from South Dakota and Colorado to the Mexican government. Their descendants live in the Mexican nature reserves El Uno Ranch at Janos and Santa Elena Canyon, Chihuahua, and Boquillas del Carmen, Coahuila, located near the southern banks of the Rio Grande, and around the grassland state line with Texas and New Mexico.

Recent genetic studies of privately owned herds of bison show that many of them include animals with genes from domestic cattle. For example, the herd on Santa Catalina Island, California, isolated since 1924 after being brought there for a movie shoot, were found to have cattle introgression. As few as 12,000 to 15,000 pure bison are estimated to remain in the world. The numbers are uncertain because the tests used to date—mitochondrial DNA analysis—indicate only if the maternal line (back from mother to mother) ever included domesticated bovines, thus say nothing about possible male input in the process. Most hybrids were found to look exactly like purebred bison; therefore, appearance is not a good indicator of genetics.

The size of the Canadian domesticated herd (genetic questions aside) grew dramatically through the 1990s and 2000s. The 2006 Census of Agriculture reported the Canadian herd at 195,728 head, a 34.9% increase since 2001. Of this total, over 95% were located in Western Canada, and less than 5% in Eastern Canada. Alberta was the province with the largest herd, accounting for 49.7% of the herd and 45.8% of the farms. The next-largest herds were in Saskatchewan (23.9%), Manitoba (10%), and British Columbia (6%). The main producing regions were in the northern parts of the Canadian prairies, specifically in the parkland belt, with the Peace River region (shared between Alberta and British Columbia) being the most important cluster, accounting for 14.4% of the national herd. Canada also exports bison meat, totaling 2,075,253 kilograms (4,575,150 lb) in 2006.

A proposal known as Buffalo Commons has been suggested by a handful of academics and policymakers to restore large parts of the drier portion of the Great Plains to native prairie grazed by bison. Proponents argue that current agricultural use of the shortgrass prairie is not sustainable, pointing to periodic disasters, including the Dust Bowl, and continuing significant human population loss over the last 60 years. However, this plan is opposed by some who live in the areas in question.

=== Domestication ===
Despite being the closest relatives of domestic cattle native to North America, bison were never domesticated by Native Americans. Later attempts of domestication by Europeans prior to the 20th century met with limited success. Bison were described as having a "wild and ungovernable temper"; they can jump close to 1.8 m (6 ft) vertically, and run 55–70 km/h (35–45 mph) when agitated. This agility and speed, combined with their great size and weight, makes bison herds difficult to confine, as they can easily escape or destroy most fencing systems, including most razor wire. The most successful systems involve large, 6-metre (20 ft) fences made from welded steel I beams sunk at least 1.8 m (6 ft) into concrete. These fencing systems, while expensive, require very little maintenance. Furthermore, making the fence sections overlap so the grassy areas beyond are not visible prevents the bison from trying to get to new range.

It has been alleged that the Aztec emperor Moctezuma II kept a bison at his private zoo (Totocalli) in Tenochtitlan, observed by the first Spanish conquistadors in the region; this would provide proof of Native Americans keeping bison in captivity, serve as an extremely far range extension south, and be the very first observation of bison by European colonists. These claims originate from Juan Díaz de Solís's interpretation of Bernal Diaz del Castillo's accounts of the totocalli, in which de Solís claims the conquistadors observed "the Mexican Bull; a wonderful composition of divers Animals." However, further analysis of del Castillo's account shows no such mention of such an animal, and the mention of this "Mexican Bull" was likely an embellishment by de Solís.

== As a symbol ==
=== Native Americans ===
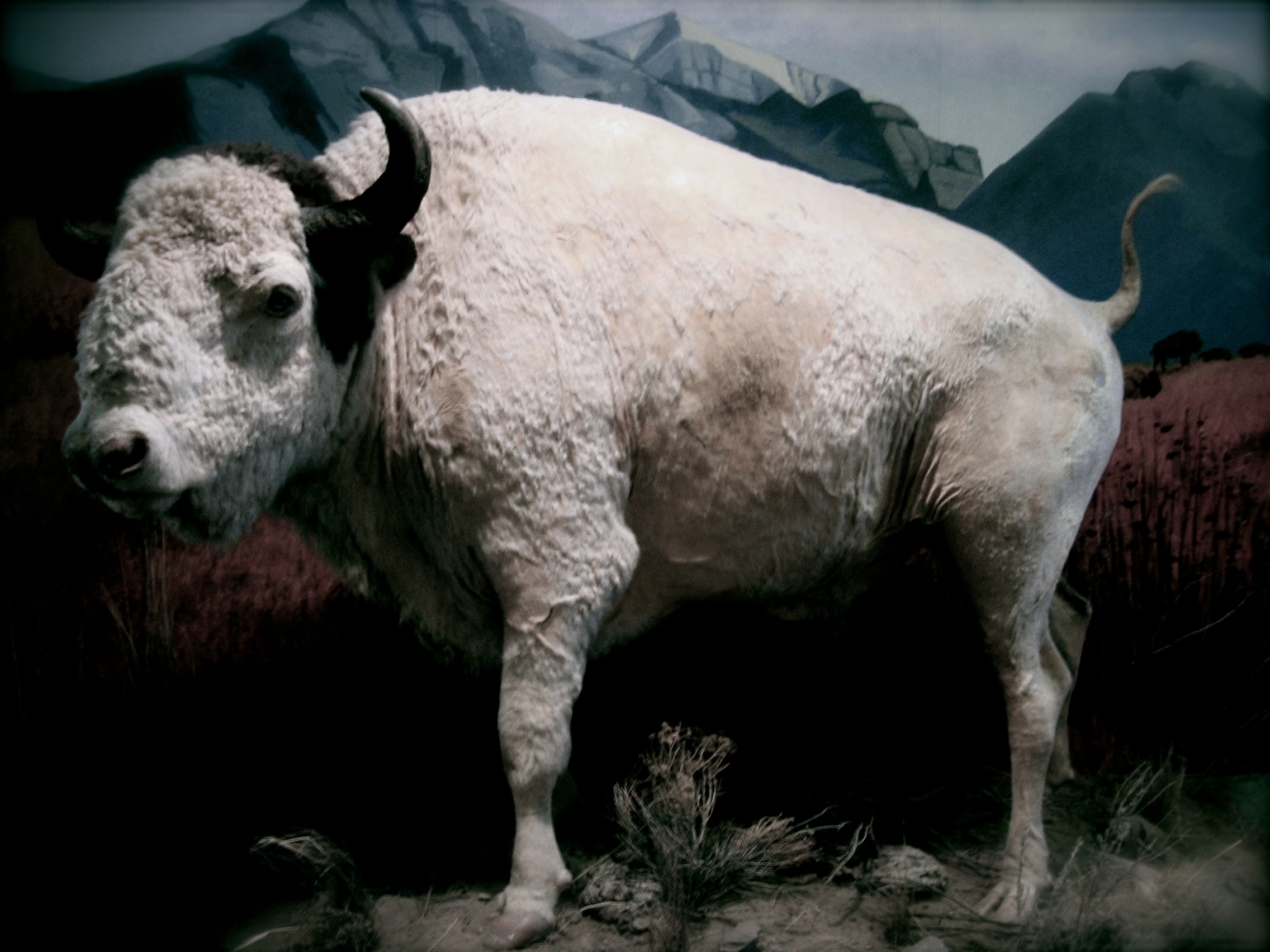
Big Medicine (1933–1959) was a sacred white buffalo that lived on the CSKT Bison Range (display at the Montana Historical Society).

Among many Native American tribes, especially the Plains Indians, the bison is considered a sacred animal and religious symbol. According to University of Montana anthropology and Native American studies professor S. Neyooxet Greymorning, "The creation stories of where buffalo came from put them in a very spiritual place among many tribes. The buffalo crossed many different areas and functions, and it was utilized in many ways. It was used in ceremonies, as well as to make tipi covers that provided homes for people, utensils, shields, weapons and parts were used for sewing with the sinew." The Sioux consider the birth of a white buffalo to be the return of White Buffalo Calf Woman, their primary cultural prophet and the bringer of their "Seven Sacred Rites". Among the Mandan and Hidatsa, the White Buffalo Cow Society was the most sacred of societies for women. Among the Lakota it is associated with Wi, the sun god.

=== North America ===
The American bison is often used in North America in official seals, flags, and logos. In 2016, the American bison became the national mammal of the United States. The bison is a popular symbol in the Great Plains states: Kansas, Oklahoma, and Wyoming have adopted the animal as their official state mammal, and many sports teams have chosen the bison as their mascot. In Canada, the bison is the official animal of the province of Manitoba and appears on the Manitoba flag. It is also used in the official coat of arms of the Royal Canadian Mounted Police.

Several American coins feature the bison, most famously on the reverse side of the "buffalo nickel" from 1913 to 1938. In 2005, the United States Mint coined a nickel with a new depiction of the bison as part of its "Westward Journey" series. The Kansas and North Dakota state quarters, part of the "50 State Quarter" series, each feature bison. The Kansas state quarter has only the bison and does not feature any writing, while the North Dakota state quarter has two bison. The Montana state quarter prominently features a bison skull over a landscape. The Yellowstone National Park quarter also features a bison standing next to a geyser.

Other institutions which have adopted the bison as a symbol or mascot include:

- U.S. Department of the Interior
- Bethany College (West Virginia)
- Bucknell University and its athletic program, the Bucknell Bison
- Buffalo, New York
- Buffalo Bills
- Buffalo Bisons
- Buffalo Gap High School
- Buffalo Grove High School
- Buffalo Sabres
- University of Colorado and its athletic program, the Colorado Buffaloes
- Gallaudet University
- Harding University and its athletic program, the Harding Bisons
- Howard University and its athletic program, the Howard Bison
- Seal of the State of Indiana
- Lipscomb University and its athletic program, the Lipscomb Bisons
- Coat of arms of Manitoba
- Flag of Manitoba
- University of Manitoba and its athletic program, the Manitoba Bisons
- Marshall University and its athletic program, the Marshall Thundering Herd
- Milligan University
- Independence Party of Minnesota
- Ralph Nader (mascot for his 2008 campaign for president)
- Nichols College
- North Dakota State University and its athletic program, the North Dakota State Bison
- Oklahoma Baptist University and its athletic program, the Oklahoma Baptist Bison
- Point Park University
- Royal Canadian Mounted Police
- Rumble the Bison (the official mascot of the Oklahoma City Thunder)
- Smoky Hill High School
- Southwestern Law School
- Tooele High School (Utah)
- Utah Tech University and its athletic program, the Utah Tech Trailblazers
- CFB Wainwright
- West Texas A&M University and its athletic program, the West Texas A&M Buffaloes
- Regional Municipality of Wood Buffalo
- Bloomington Bison

Wyoming uses a bison in its state flag

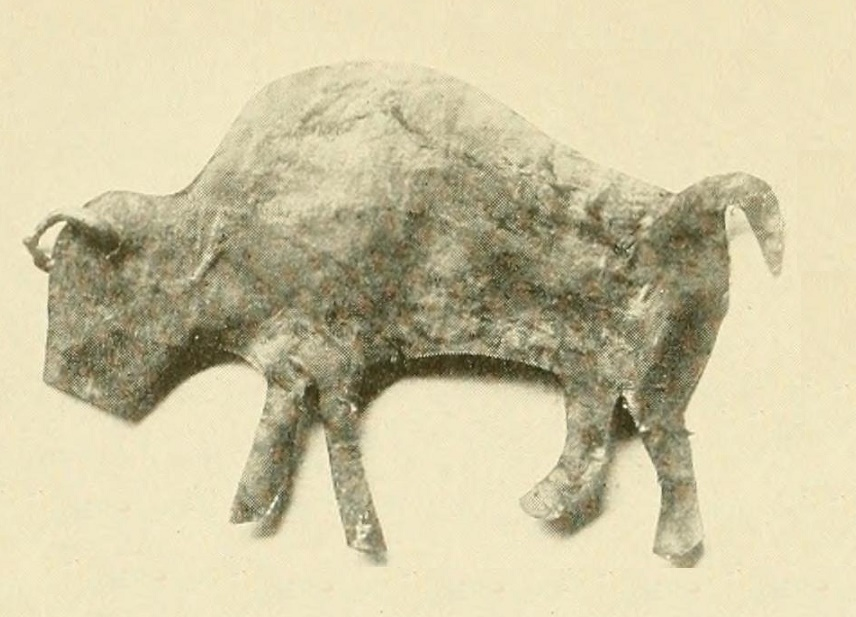
Skin effigy of a Buffalo used in the Lakota Sun Dance

Manitoba uses a bison in its provincial flag, as seen inside the Manitoban coat of arms

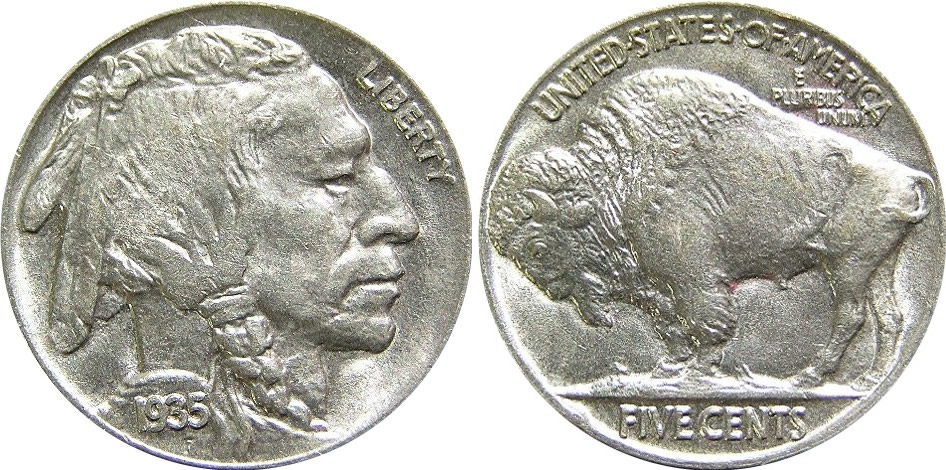
The 1935 Buffalo nickel—this style of coin featuring an American bison was produced from 1913 to 1938

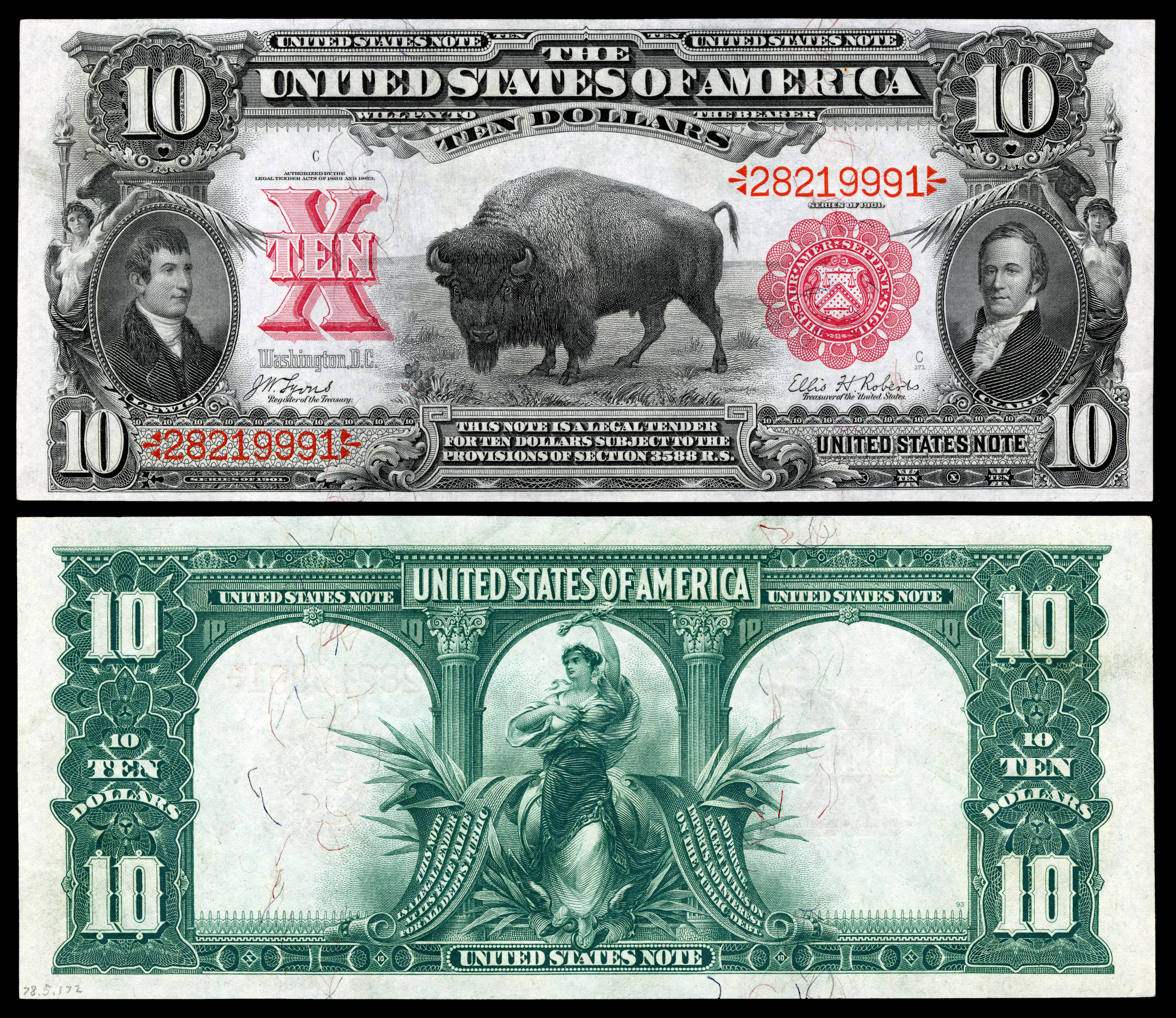
Series 1901 $10 legal tender depicting an American bison

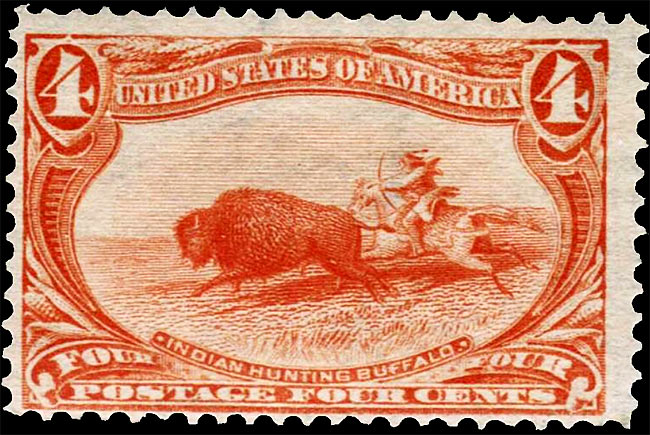
First postage stamp with image of bison was issued US in 1898—4¢ "Indian Hunting Buffalo"

== See also ==
- American Bison Society
- Buffalo Commons
- Buffalo Hunters' War
- Buffalo Treaty
- Conservation of American bison
- Great Plains Ecoregion
- List of animals with humps
- Plains hide painting
