= National symbols of the United States =

National symbols of the United States are the symbols used to represent the United States of America.

== List of symbols ==
Symbol	Name	File	Ref.
Flag	Flag of the United States		
Oath of Allegiance	Pledge of Allegiance		
Seal	Great Seal of the United States	(obverse) (reverse)	
National mammal	American bison		
National anthem	"The Star-Spangled Banner"	"The Star-Spangled Banner"	
National motto	"In God We Trust"		
National floral emblem	Rose	rosa carolina	
National march	"The Stars and Stripes Forever"	"The Stars and Stripes Forever"	
National tree	Oak tree (Quercus)		
National bird	Bald eagle		

== See also ==
- Lists of United States state symbols
