= White Buffalo Cow Society =

Native American women's society

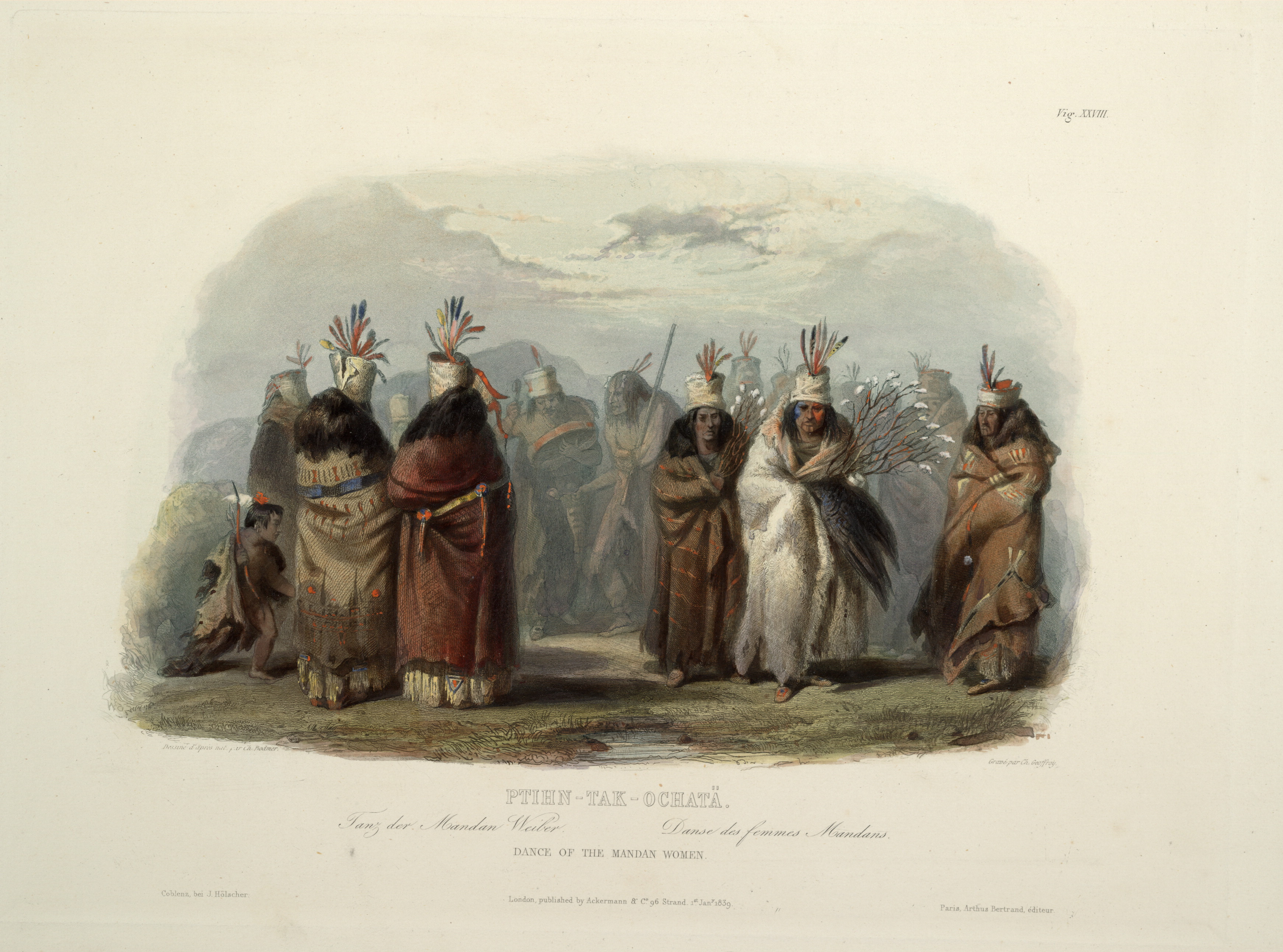
Ptihn-Tak-Ochatä - Dance of the Mandan Women by Karl Bodmer, 1840–1843

The White Buffalo Cow Society (Hidatsa: Ptī′take Ō′xat'e) has historically been the most respected women's society amongst the Mandan and Hidatsa peoples. The women of the White Buffalo Cow Society perform the buffalo-calling ceremony. Modern societies dedicated to White Buffalo Calf Woman are often dedicated to protection of women and children from rape and domestic violence.

== Origin ==
The White Buffalo Cow Society originated with the Mandan but was adopted by the Hidatsa. Other Oceti Sakowin tribes who also depend on the buffalo may have similar women's societies. This society, associated with the White Buffalo Cow oral history, has historically performed important buffalo-calling rites. It is an all-women's society, and the leaders are mature or elderly women.

== Regalia ==
In ceremonies written about by men in the 1800s, they said members of the society have traditionally painted one eye a color based on their personal preference, typically blue, tattooed black marks between their lips and chin, and some women wore a headdress made of white buffalo cowhide embellished with feathers. At certain ceremonial dances, the leader is said to have worn a white buffalo cow hide blanket and danced while holding a bundle of twigs capped with eagle plumes.

== See also ==
- White Buffalo Calf Woman
- Dignity (statue)
