= Dignity of Earth and Sky =

Sculpture in South Dakota, United States

- Dignity statue with star quilt
- Interactive map of Dignity of Earth and Sky
- Location: Chamberlain, South Dakota, U.S.
- Coordinates: 43°47′12.75″N 99°20′17.83″W
- Designer: Dale Claude Lamphere; Star Quilt by David Claymore (Lakota)
- Material: stainless steel
- Width: 32 feet (9.8 m)
- Height: 50 feet (15 m)

Dignity of Earth and Sky is a sculpture on a bluff overlooking the Missouri River near Chamberlain, South Dakota. The 50-foot (15 m) high stainless steel statue by South Dakota artist laureate Dale Claude Lamphere depicts an Indigenous woman in Plains-style dress receiving a star quilt. According to Lamphere, the sculpture honors the culture of the Lakota and Dakota peoples who are indigenous to South Dakota. Assisting Lamphere were sculptors Tom Trople, Jim Maher, Andy Roltgen, and Grant Standard. Automotive paint expert Brook Loobey assisted with the colors for the quilt, and Albertson Engineering of Rapid City, South Dakota, ensured the sculpture would endure the strong winds common in the area.

== History ==
Norm and Eunabel McKie of Rapid City, South Dakota, announced their gift of Dignity to the State of South Dakota in 2014, in honor of the 125th anniversary of South Dakota statehood. The artist began by first drawing the form and then sculpting a one-eighth-scale model. The sculpture was created in an isolated area near the Cheyenne River, east of Rapid City, and later moved to the installation site. Dignity was erected in September 2016 at a site near Interstate 90 at Chamberlain, South Dakota, where it overlooks the Missouri River.

Since July 1, 2017, South Dakota residents are now able to purchase auto license plates bearing the likeness of Dignity. The plates were designed with the help of the statue's designer.

== Design ==
The statue is situated in the Chamberlain Interstate Welcome Center located along Interstate 90's mile post 264 and is accessible by both directions of travel. It measures 50 feet (15 m) high, 16 feet (4.9 m) deep and 32 feet (9.8 m) wide. The star quilt held by the woman has more than 100 blue diamond shapes that move in the wind "like an Aspen leaf".

Three Native American women from Rapid City, South Dakota, served as the models for the sculpture.

Lamphere's plan is to put the name of every federally recognized tribe on a stainless steel band around the base of the statue. He said, "I wanted something that would really honor the indigenous people of the Great Plains and I kept that in mind all the time. I made the work reflect the name that it has of 'Dignity', and I think that's part of what makes it work so well."

== Reception ==
When interviewed nearly a year after the dedication, Lamphere said "It's been well-received by the Native community, and by visitors from all over the country. My hope over time is it really gets people to think about the beauty of the native cultures."

In a 2017 column published in the Sioux Falls Argus Leader, Susan Claussen Bunger, instructor of Native American social systems, wrote:

As is evident through history, humans will ultimately disillusion and betray. As is such, I have a new role model who is solid and sturdy. She literally owns a spine of steel and reminds me of the injustice in the world, but also of strength, perseverance and survival. She signifies people who have prevailed through the centuries. She represents all who resist and strive forward. She portrays a rallying cry for those who wish to be heard and valued. She stands strong and proud, meeting the morning sun and bracing against the nighttime cold. She contemplates the world through a poise of conviction and fearlessness. Her name is "Dignity".

== In popular culture ==
On April 27, 2020, the Dignity statue was used as a clue on the game show Jeopardy! The clue was "A 50-foot stainless steel South Dakota statue called Dignity honors the culture of the Dakota and this group whose name rhymes with Dakota." The answer was "the Lakota tribe." The contestant answered correctly.

== See also ==
- African Renaissance Monument
- Crazy Horse Memorial
- Christ the Redeemer
- Christ of the Andes
- The Motherland Calls
- Statue of Liberty (Liberty Enlightening the World)
- List of statues
