= List of bison conservation herds in North America =

Conservation of American bison is heavily tied with conservation herds and the protected areas they roam. American bison occupy less than one percent of their historical range with fewer than 20,000 bison in conservation herds on public, tribal or private protected lands. The roughly 500,000 animals that are raised for commercial purposes are not included unless the entity is engaged in conservation efforts.

Name	Location	Operator	Herd size
American Prairie	Montana	American Prairie Foundation	800+
Antelope Island State Park	Utah	Utah State Parks	200
Badlands National Park	South Dakota	National Park Service	1000
Banff National Park	Alberta	Parks Canada	36
Battelle Darby Creek Metro Park	Ohio	Columbus and Franklin County Metro Parks	10
Bear Butte State Park	South Dakota	South Dakota Department of Game, Fish, and Parks	small
Bear River State Park	Wyoming	Wyoming Division of State Parks and Historic Sites	10
Blue Mounds State Park	Minnesota	Minnesota Department of Natural Resources	100
Broken Kettle Grasslands Preserve	Iowa	The Nature Conservancy	200
Buffaloland Park	Prince Edward Island	Moonlight PEI Sanctuaries	43
Buffalo Pound Provincial Park	Saskatchewan	Saskatchewan Environment, Parks Branch	
Camp Pendleton bison herd	California	USMC (Camp Pendleton Game Warden's Office)	90
Camp Wainwright	Alberta	Department of National Defence (Canada)	
Caprock Canyons State Park	Texas	Texas Parks and Wildlife Department	150
Catalina Island bison herd	California	Catalina Island Conservancy	100
Chickasaw National Recreation Area	Oklahoma	National Park Service	3
Clymer Meadow Preserve	Texas	The Nature Conservancy	
Chief Mountain Wilderness Unit	Montana	Blackfeet Nation	25
Chippewa Cree Tribal Buffalo Pasture	Montana	Chippewa Cree	11
Chitina herd	Alaska	Alaska Department of Fish and Game	
Copper River herd	Alaska	Alaska Department of Fish and Game	
Crane Trust	Nebraska	Crane Trust	50+
Cross Ranch Nature Preserve	North Dakota	The Nature Conservancy	200
CSKT Bison Range	Montana	Confederated Salish and Kootenai Tribes	500
Cuenca Los Ojos	Sonora		
Custer State Park	South Dakota	South Dakota Department of Game, Fish, and Parks	1500
Daniels Park	Colorado	Denver Parks and Recreation	30
Delta Junction herd	Alaska	Alaska Department of Fish and Game	
Elk Island National Park	Alberta	Parks Canada	315
El Santuario Ecological Reserve	Coahuila	Pro Cuatrociénegas Foundation	
Farewell Lake herd	Alaska	Alaska Department of Fish and Game	
Fermilab bison herd	Illinois	U.S. Department of Energy	28
Finney Game Refuge	Kansas	Kansas Department of Wildlife and Parks	
Fort Niobrara National Wildlife Refuge	Nebraska	U.S. Fish and Wildlife Service	350
Fort Peck Indian Reservation	Montana	Assiniboine and Sioux Tribes	400
Fort Robinson State Park	Nebraska	Nebraska Game and Parks Commission	150
Fort Worth Nature Center and Refuge	Texas	Fort Worth, Texas	18
Genesee Park	Colorado	Denver Parks and Recreation	33
Grand Teton National Park–National Elk Refuge bison herd	Wyoming	National Park Service	1000
Grasslands National Park	Saskatchewan	Parks Canada	300
Hay-Zama Lakes Wildland Park	Alberta	Alberta Parks	400
Henry Mountains bison herd	Utah	Utah Division of Wildlife Resources, Bureau of Land Management	400
Hot Springs State Park	Wyoming	Wyoming Division of State Parks and Historic Sites	15
House Rock State Wildlife Area	Arizona	Arizona Game and Fish Department	
Innoko National Wildlife Refuge	Alaska	U.S. Fish and Wildlife Service	94
Janos Biosphere Reserve	Chihuahua	Secretariat of Environment and Natural Resources	138
Kankakee Sands	Indiana	The Nature Conservancy	90+
Konza Prairie Biological Station	Kansas	The Nature Conservancy, Kansas State University	300
Land Between the Lakes National Recreation Area	Kentucky	U.S. Forest Service	50
Maderas del Carmen	Coahuila	Secretariat of Environment and Natural Resources	19
Maxwell Wildlife Refuge	Kansas	Kansas Department of Wildlife and Parks	150
Medano–Zapata Ranch	Colorado	The Nature Conservancy	
Midewin National Tallgrass Prairie	Illinois	U.S. Forest Service	50
Minneopa State Park	Minnesota	Minnesota Department of Natural Resources	30
Nachusa Grasslands	Illinois	The Nature Conservancy	130
Niobrara Valley Preserve	Nebraska	The Nature Conservancy	
Neal Smith National Wildlife Refuge	Iowa	U.S. Fish and Wildlife Service	50
Old Man on His Back Prairie and Heritage Conservation Area	Saskatchewan	Nature Conservancy of Canada	115
Ordway Prairie Preserve	South Dakota	The Nature Conservancy	
Paynes Prairie Preserve State Park	Florida	Florida Department of Environmental Protection	50-70
Pink Mountain	British Columbia	British Columbia Department of Water, Lands and Air Protection	
Prairie State Park	Missouri	Missouri Department of Natural Resources	100
Primrose Lake Air Weapons Range	Alberta–Saskatchewan	CFB Cold Lake, Department of National Defence (Canada)	
Prince Albert National Park	Saskatchewan	Parks Canada	400
Raymond State Wildlife Area	Arizona	Arizona Game and Fish Department	
Riding Mountain National Park	Manitoba	Parks Canada	40
Rocky Mountain Arsenal National Wildlife Refuge	Colorado	U.S. Fish and Wildlife Service	150
Sandhill Wildlife Area	Wisconsin	Wisconsin Department of Natural Resources	15
Sandsage Bison Range & Wildlife Area	Kansas	Kansas Department of Wildlife and Parks	51
Smoky Valley Ranch	Kansas	The Nature Conservancy	
Soapstone Prairie/Red Mountain	Colorado	Fort Collins, Colorado and Larimer County	100
Spring Lake Park Reserve	Minnesota	Dakota County Parks	12
Tallgrass Prairie National Preserve	Kansas	The Nature Conservancy, National Park Service	90
Tallgrass Prairie Preserve	Oklahoma	The Nature Conservancy	2500
Theodore Roosevelt National Park	North Dakota	National Park Service	800
Trexler Nature Preserve	Pennsylvania	Lehigh County	14
Vermejo Reserve	New Mexico and Colorado	Ted Turner	1200
Wanuskewin Heritage Park	Saskatchewan	Wanuskewin Heritage Park Authority	12
Waterton Lakes National Park	Alberta	Parks Canada	6
White Horse Hill National Game Preserve	North Dakota	U.S. Fish and Wildlife Service	20
Wichita Mountains Wildlife Refuge	Oklahoma	U.S. Fish and Wildlife Service	650
Wildcat Hills State Recreation Area	Nebraska	Nebraska Game and Parks Commission	
Wind Cave National Park	South Dakota	National Park Service	400
Wolakota Buffalo Range	South Dakota	Rosebud Economic Development Corporation	100
Wood Buffalo National Park	Alberta and Northwest Territories	Parks Canada	3000
Yellowstone National Park	Idaho, Montana, Wyoming	National Park Service	4800
Commercial herds are not included. Listed herds remove excess bison on a regular basis which may be slaughtered for commercial purposes.

== See also ==
- Buffalo Treaty
