= List of protected grasslands of North America =

Prairies generally within the Interior Plains

The protected grasslands of North America consist of prairies, with a dominant vegetation type of herbaceous plants like grasses, sedges, and other prairie plants, rather than woody vegetation like trees. Grasslands were generally dominant within the Interior Plains of central North America but was also present elsewhere. The protected areas for this ecosystem include public nature reserves managed by American, Canadian and Mexican wildlife management agencies, Native American tribes and Canadian First Nations, state wildlife management agencies, non-governmental organizations, and private nature reserves.

Generally speaking, these regions are devoid of trees, except for riparian or gallery forests associated with streams and rivers. The tallgrass prairie, with moderate rainfall and rich soils, were ideally suited to agriculture so it became a productive grain-growing region. The tallgrass prairie ecosystem covered some 170 million acres (690,000 km^{2}) of North America. Besides agriculture, much of the shortgrass prairie became grazing land for domestic livestock. Short grasslands occur in semi-arid climates while tall grasslands are in areas of higher rainfall. Although much of the grasslands are in the Great Plains ecoregion, protected grasslands can be found in other areas of Canada, Mexico and the United States. Desert (arid) grasslands are composed of sparse grassland ecoregions located in the deserts and xeric shrublands biome. Temperature extremes and low amounts of rainfall characterise these kinds of grasslands. Therefore, plants and animals are well adapted to minimize water loss. Shrub-steppe is also a type of low-rainfall natural grassland. While arid, shrub-steppes have sufficient moisture to support a cover of perennial grasses or shrubs, a feature which distinguishes them from deserts. The shrub-steppes of North America occur in the western United States and western Canada, in the rain shadow between the Cascades and Sierra Nevada on the west and the Rocky Mountains on the east.

The expanses of grass once sustained migrations of an estimated 30 to 60 million American bison which maintained grazing pressure as a keystone species. Once bison could be found across much of North America. While they ranged from the eastern seaboard states to southeast Washington, eastern Oregon, and northeastern California, the greatest numbers were found within the great bison belt on the shortgrass plains east of the Rocky Mountains that stretched from Alberta to Texas. Grazing is important to soil, vegetation and overall ecological balance. The ecosystem was maintained by a pattern of disturbance caused by natural wildfire and grazing by bison, a pattern which is called pyric herbivory. The indigenous peoples of the Plains occupied the land, hunting bison and pronghorn. The expansion of the United States onto the frontier decimated the population of the indigenous people and the bison. Bison occupy less than 1% of their historical range with fewer than 20,000 bison in conservation herds on public, tribal or private protected lands. Roughly 500,000 animals are raised for commercial purposes.

The plowing of the tallgrass prairie to plant crops destroyed the natural habitat. Less than 4 percent of the prairie is left according to most estimates. Intensive farming, urbanization, and the spread of trees - that were formerly limited by periodic fires - continue to contribute to habitat loss. Studies estimated in 2018 that grasslands in the U.S were being lost at a rate of more than one-million-acre per year (0.40×10^{6} ha).

== Protected areas ==
| Name | Location | Operator | Bison |
|---|---|---|---|
| Akin Prairie | Kansas | Kansas Land Trust | |
| American Prairie | Montana | American Prairie Foundation | Yes |
| Antelope Island State Park | Utah | Utah State Parks | Yes |
| Badlands National Park | South Dakota | National Park Service | Yes |
| Baker Wetlands | Kansas | Baker University | |
| Baskett Slough National Wildlife Refuge | Oregon | U.S. Fish and Wildlife Service | |
| Battelle Darby Creek Metro Park | Ohio | Columbus and Franklin County Metro Parks | Yes |
| Bear Butte State Park | South Dakota | South Dakota Department of Game, Fish, and Parks | Yes |
| Bear River State Park | Wyoming | Wyoming Division of State Parks and Historic Sites | Yes |
| Big Basin Prairie Preserve | Kansas | Kansas Department of Wildlife and Parks | |
| Big Thicket National Preserve | Texas | National Park Service | |
| Blackburn State Park | Iowa | Iowa Department of Natural Resources | |
| Black Kettle National Grassland | Texas | U.S. Forest Service | |
| Blue Mounds State Park | Minnesota | Minnesota Department of Natural Resources | Yes |
| Bonham State Park | Texas | Texas Parks and Wildlife Department | |
| Broken Kettle Grasslands Preserve | Iowa | The Nature Conservancy | Yes |
| Buena Vista Wildlife Area | Wisconsin | Wisconsin Department of Natural Resources | |
| Buenos Aires National Wildlife Refuge | Arizona | U.S. Fish and Wildlife Service | |
| Buffalo Gap National Grassland | South Dakota | U.S. Forest Service | |
| Burr Oak Woods Conservation Area | Missouri | Missouri Department of Conservation | |
| Camp Pendleton | California | United States Marine Corps | Yes |
| Caprock Canyons State Park | Texas | Texas Parks and Wildlife Department | Yes |
| Carrizo Plain National Monument | California | U.S. Bureau of Land Management | |
| Catoosa Wildlife Management Area | Tennessee | Tennessee Wildlife Resources Agency | |
| Cayler Prairie State Preserve | Iowa | Iowa Department of Natural Resources | |
| Cedar Creek Ecosystem Science Reserve | Minnesota | University of Minnesota College of Biological Sciences | |
| Chickasaw National Recreation Area | Oklahoma | National Park Service | Yes |
| Chippewa Cree Tribal Buffalo Pasture | Montana | Chippewa Cree | Yes |
| Cimarron National Grassland | Kansas | U.S. Forest Service | |
| Clinton State Park | Kansas | Kansas Department of Wildlife and Parks | |
| Clymer Meadow Preserve | Texas | The Nature Conservancy | |
| Comanche National Grassland | Colorado | U.S. Forest Service | |
| Conrad Savanna Nature Preserve | Indiana | Indiana Department of Natural Resources | |
| Cosumnes River Preserve | California | The Nature Conservancy, Bureau of Land Management, Ducks Unlimited, Department of Fish and Wildlife, Department of Water Resources, Sacramento County Department of Parks and Recreation, and the state Wildlife Conservation Board | |
| Crane Trust | Nebraska | Crane Trust | Yes |
| Crex Meadows Wildlife Area | Wisconsin | Wisconsin Department of Natural Resources | |
| Cross Plains State Park | Wisconsin | Wisconsin Department of Natural Resources | |
| Crooked River National Grassland | Oregon | U.S. Forest Service | |
| Cross Ranch Nature Preserve | North Dakota | The Nature Conservancy | Yes |
| Crow-Hassan Park Reserve | Minnesota | Three Rivers Park District | |
| CSKT Bison Range | Montana | Confederated Salish and Kootenai Tribes | Yes |
| Custer State Park | South Dakota | South Dakota Department of Game, Fish, and Parks | Yes |
| Cypress Hills Interprovincial Park | Alberta, Saskatchewan | Alberta Environment and Parks and Ministry of Parks, Culture and Sport (Saskatchewan) | |
| Daniels Park | Colorado | Denver | Yes |
| Dorsett Hill Prairie Conservation Area | Missouri | Missouri Department of Conservation | |
| Driftless Area National Wildlife Refuge | Iowa, Wisconsin | U.S. Fish and Wildlife Service | |
| Dunbar Cave State Park | Tennessee | Tennessee Department of Environment and Conservation | |
| Ebey's Landing National Historical Reserve | Washington | National Park Service | |
| Elk Cove Meadow | Oregon | U.S. Forest Service | |
| Elk Island National Park | Alberta | Parks Canada | Yes |
| Fermilab | Illinois | U.S. Department of Energy | Yes |
| Flint Hills National Wildlife Refuge | Kansas | U.S. Fish and Wildlife Service | |
| Fort Niobrara National Wildlife Refuge | Nebraska | U.S. Fish and Wildlife Service | Yes |
| Fort Pierre National Grassland | South Dakota | U.S. Forest Service | |
| Fort Peck Indian Reservation | Montana | Assiniboine and Sioux Tribes | Yes |
| Fort Ridgely State Park | Minnesota | Minnesota Department of Natural Resources | |
| Fort Robinson State Park | Nebraska | Nebraska Game and Parks Commission | Yes |
| Fort Scott National Historic Site | Kansas | National Park Service | |
| Fort Worth Nature Center and Refuge | Texas | Fort Worth, Texas | Yes |
| Gaviota State Park | California | California Department of Parks and Recreation | |
| Genesee Park | Colorado | Denver | Yes |
| Gensburg-Markham Prairie | Illinois | The Nature Conservancy, Northeastern Illinois University, the Natural Land Institute | |
| George Washington Carver National Monument | Missouri | National Park Service | |
| Gitchie Manitou State Preserve | Iowa | Iowa Department of Natural Resources | |
| Glacial Ridge National Wildlife Refuge | Minnesota | U.S. Fish and Wildlife Service | |
| Golden Prairie | Missouri | Missouri Prairie Foundation | |
| Grand River National Grassland | South Dakota | U.S. Forest Service | |
| Grand Teton National Park/National Elk Refuge | Wyoming | National Park Service | Yes |
| Grant-Bradbury Prairie Preserve | Kansas | Shawnee County Parks and Recreation | |
| Grasslands National Park | Saskatchewan | Parks Canada | Yes |
| Great Sand Dunes National Park and Preserve | Colorado | National Park Service | |
| Great Valley Grasslands State Park | California | California Department of Parks and Recreation | |
| Hayden Prairie State Preserve | Iowa | Iowa Department of Natural Resources | |
| Hay-Zama Lakes Wildland Park | Alberta | Alberta Parks | Yes |
| Hempstead Plains Preserve | New York | Nassau County | |
| Henry Mountains | Utah | Utah Division of Wildlife Resources, Bureau of Land Management | Yes |
| Herbert Hoover National Historic Site | Iowa | National Park Service | |
| Hitchcock Nature Center | Iowa | Pottawattamie County Conservation Board | |
| Homestead National Historical Park | Nebraska | National Park Service | |
| Hoosier Prairie State Nature Preserve | Indiana | National Park Service | |
| Hot Springs State Park | Wyoming | Wyoming Division of State Parks and Historic Sites | Yes |
| Innoko National Wildlife Refuge | Alaska | U.S. Fish and Wildlife Service | Yes |
| Ivan Boyd Prairie Preserve | Kansas | Douglas County Public Works | |
| Janos Biosphere Reserve | Chihuahua | Secretariat of Environment and Natural Resources | Yes |
| Jenner Headlands Preserve | California | The Wildlands Conservancy | |
| Joseph H. Williams Tallgrass Prairie Preserve | Oklahoma | The Nature Conservancy | Yes |
| J. T. Nickel Family Nature and Wildlife Preserve | Oklahoma | The Nature Conservancy | |
| Kankakee Sands | Indiana | The Nature Conservancy | Yes |
| Kanopolis State Park | Kansas | Kansas Department of Wildlife and Parks | |
| Kingston Prairie Preserve | Oregon | Greenbelt Land Trust | |
| Kiowa National Grassland | New Mexico | U.S. Forest Service | |
| Kissimmee Prairie Preserve State Park | Florida | Florida Department of Environmental Protection | |
| Knob Noster State Park | Missouri | Missouri Department of Natural Resources | |
| Konza Prairie Biological Station | Kansas | The Nature Conservancy, Kansas State University | Yes |
| Land Between the Lakes National Recreation Area | Kentucky | U.S. Forest Service | Yes |
| Las Cienegas National Conservation Area | Arizona | U.S. Bureau of Land Management | |
| Lynx Prairie | Ohio | The Nature Conservancy | |
| Lost Trail National Wildlife Refuge | Montana | U.S. Fish and Wildlife Service | |
| Lyndon B. Johnson National Grassland | Texas | U.S. Forest Service | |
| Maderas del Carmen | Coahuila | Secretariat of Environment and Natural Resources | Yes |
| Maxwell Wildlife Refuge | Kansas | Kansas Department of Wildlife and Parks | Yes |
| McClellan Creek National Grassland | Texas | U.S. Forest Service | |
| Mead Wildlife Area | Wisconsin | Wisconsin Department of Natural Resources | |
| Midewin National Tallgrass Prairie | Illinois | U.S. Forest Service | Yes |
| Minneopa State Park | Minnesota | Minnesota Department of Natural Resources | Yes |
| Missimer Wildflower Preserve | California | Land Trust of Napa County | |
| Missisquoi National Wildlife Refuge | Vermont | U.S. Fish and Wildlife Service | |
| Muleshoe National Wildlife Refuge | Texas | U.S. Fish and Wildlife Service | |
| Nachusa Grasslands | Illinois | The Nature Conservancy | Yes |
| Neal Smith National Wildlife Refuge | Iowa | U.S. Fish and Wildlife Service | Yes |
| Oglala National Grassland | Nebraska | U.S. Forest Service | |
| Ojibway Prairie Complex | Ontario | Windsor, Ontario, Ontario Parks | |
| Old Man on His Back Prairie and Heritage Conservation Area | Saskatchewan | Nature Conservancy of Canada | Yes |
| Pawnee National Grassland | Colorado | U.S. Forest Service | |
| Paynes Prairie Preserve State Park | Florida | Florida Department of Environmental Protection | Yes |
| Pee Dee National Wildlife Refuge | North Carolina | U.S. Fish and Wildlife Service | |
| Perrot State Park | Wisconsin | Wisconsin Department of Natural Resources | |
| Phil Hardberger Park | Texas | San Antonio | |
| Piñon Canyon Maneuver Site | Colorado | U.S. Army | |
| Point Reyes National Seashore | California | National Park Service | |
| Prairie State Park | Missouri | Missouri Department of Natural Resources | Yes |
| Prince Albert National Park | Saskatchewan | Parks Canada | Yes |
| Quivira National Wildlife Refuge | Kansas | U.S. Fish and Wildlife Service | |
| Riding Mountain National Park | Manitoba | Parks Canada | Yes |
| Rita Blanca National Grassland | Texas | U.S. Forest Service | |
| Rockefeller Prairie | Kansas | University of Kansas | |
| Rocky Mountain Arsenal National Wildlife Refuge | Colorado | U.S. Fish and Wildlife Service | Yes |
| Rocky Prairie | Washington | | |
| Saeger Woods Conservation Area | Missouri | Missouri Department of Conservation | |
| Salt Plains National Wildlife Refuge | Oklahoma | U.S. Fish and Wildlife Service | |
| San Bernardino National Wildlife Refuge | Arizona | U.S. Fish and Wildlife Service | |
| Sand Creek Massacre National Historic Site | Colorado | National Park Service | |
| San Luis National Wildlife Refuge Complex | California | U.S. Fish and Wildlife Service | |
| Sandhill Wildlife Area | Wisconsin | Wisconsin Department of Natural Resources | Yes |
| Sandsage Bison Range & Wildlife Area | Kansas | Kansas Department of Wildlife and Parks | Yes |
| Searles Prairie Natural Area | Arkansas | Arkansas Natural Heritage Commission | |
| Searls Park Prairie | Illinois | Illinois Department of Natural Resources | |
| Slinde Mounds State Preserve | Iowa | Iowa Department of Natural Resources | |
| Soapstone Prairie/Red Mountain | Colorado | Fort Collins, Colorado and Larimer County | Yes |
| Spirit Mound Historic Prairie | South Dakota | South Dakota Department of Game, Fish, and Parks | |
| Stone State Park | Iowa | Iowa Department of Natural Resources | |
| Tallgrass Prairie National Preserve | Kansas | The Nature Conservancy, National Park Service | Yes |
| Tallgrass Prairie Preserve | Oklahoma | The Nature Conservancy | Yes |
| Theodore Roosevelt National Park | North Dakota | National Park Service | Yes |
| Thunder Basin National Grassland | Wyoming | U.S. Forest Service | |
| Trexler Nature Preserve | Pennsylvania | Lehigh County | Yes |
| Turkey River Mounds State Preserve | Iowa | Iowa Department of Natural Resources | |
| Valentine National Wildlife Refuge | Nebraska | U.S. Fish and Wildlife Service | |
| Valles Caldera National Preserve | New Mexico | National Park Service | |
| Vermejo Reserve | New Mexico and Colorado | Ted Turner | Yes |
| Wanuskewin Heritage Park | Saskatchewan | Wanuskewin Heritage Park Authority | Yes |
| Waterton Lakes National Park | Alberta | Parks Canada | Yes |
| White Horse Hill National Game Preserve | North Dakota | U.S. Fish and Wildlife Service | Yes |
| Whorehouse Meadow | Oregon | U.S. Bureau of Land Management | |
| Wichita Mountains Wildlife Refuge | Oklahoma | U.S. Fish and Wildlife Service | Yes |
| Wild Horse Island | Montana | Montana Department of Fish, Wildlife and Parks | |
| Wildlife Prairie Park | Illinois | Friends of Wildlife Prairie Park | |
| Willa Cather Memorial Prairie | Nebraska | Willa Cather Foundation | |
| Willamette Floodplain | Oregon | U.S. Fish and Wildlife Service | |
| Wind Cave National Park | South Dakota | National Park Service | Yes |
| Wolakota Buffalo Range | South Dakota | Rosebud Economic Development Corporation | Yes |
| Wood Buffalo National Park | Alberta and Northwest Territories | Parks Canada | Yes |
| Yellowstone National Park | Idaho, Montana, Wyoming | National Park Service | Yes |
| Zumwalt Prairie | Oregon | The Nature Conservancy | |

== Cemetery prairies ==
Cemetery prairies are remnants of native North American prairie.

- Bigelow Cemetery Preserve, Ohio
- Brown School Road Cemetery, St. Joseph, Michigan
- Brownlee Prairie Cemetery Nature Preserve, Illinois
- Calvary Catholic Cemetery, St. Louis
- Clay Prairie, Allison, Iowa
- German Methodist Cemetery Prairie State Nature Preserve, Lake County, Indiana
- German Settler Cemetery, La Paz, Indiana
- Goewey Township Cemetery, Osceola County, Iowa
- Harrison Cemetery Prairie, southwest Michigan
- Hess Cemetery near Eagle Point, Illinois
- Horton Township Cemetery Prairie Preserve, Osceola County, Iowa
- Johnson Cemetery, Hillsdale County, Michigan
- Loda Cemetery Prairie, Illinois
- Mount Hope Cemetery, Barry County, Michigan
- Munson Township Cemetery Prairie Nature Preserve, north of Cambridge, Henry County, Illinois
- Pellsville Pioneer Cemetery, Butler Township, Vermilion County, Illinois
- Pioneer Cemetery, south of Baldwin City, Douglas County, Kansas
- Prospect Cemetery State Preserve
- Queen Anne Prairie Cemetery, Woodstock, Illinois
- Rochester Cemetery, Cedar County, Iowa, established 1830s on 13.5 acres (5.5 ha; 0.055 km^{2}) of hills in sand prairie-savanna grassland near the Cedar River
- Smith Cemetery Prairie Nature Preserve, Darby Township, Madison County, Ohio
- Sumnerville Cemetery, Cass County, Michigan
- Tomlinson Cemetery, Champaign County, Illinois
- Weston Cemetery Prairie, Yates Township, McLean County, Illinois

== See also ==
- Bison herds topics
- Bison hunting § Resurgence of the bison
- History of bison conservation in Canada
- U.S. National Grasslands
- Pre-Columbian savannas of North America
- United States Grasslands Reserve Program
- List of ecoregions affected by woody plant encroachment § United States of America
