= Lloyd Hulbert =

American botanist (1918–1986)

- Born: June 27, 1918; Lapeer, Michigan
- Died: May 23, 1986 (aged 67); Bahamas
- Education: Michigan State University, Washington State University
- Known for: Establishing Konza Prairie and research in botany
- Scientific career
- Fields: Biology, botany, plant ecology

Lloyd Clair Hulbert (June 27, 1918 – May 23, 1986) was a professor of biology at Kansas State University from 1955 until 1986. He was recognized for his work to establish Konza Prairie and served as its first director from 1971–1986. Hulbert was internationally known for his "research of bluestem (tallgrass) prairie and prairie-forest interactions."

== Early life and education ==
Lloyd Hulbert was born in Lapeer, Michigan, on June 27, 1918. He attended college at Michigan State University and in 1940 earned a bachelor's degree in wildlife conservation.

During World War II he chose, instead of fighting, to volunteer for the Civilian Public Service. Hulbert, being a Quaker, was a pacifist for moral reasons. People in the Civilian Public Service were conscientious objectors to the war who worked in the United States in the areas of soil conservation, forestry, fire fighting, agriculture, social services and mental health. While in the Civilian Public Service, Hulbert performed range reseeding research in Montana and worked as a 'smoke jumper'. A smoke jumper is a "wildland firefighter who specializes in parachuting to fires in remote areas." "His experiences as a smoke jumper fueled a subsequent interest in the role of fire in natural ecosystems which became a major focus of his research in later years."

Hulbert received his Ph.D. in botany and plant ecology from Washington State University in 1953. "His dissertation research at Washington State [University] concerned ways to accelerate succession on rangelands from introduced biomes such as cheatgrass to indigenous perennial species."

== Work at Kansas State University and the foundation of Konza Prairie ==
Hulbert began working at Kansas State University in 1955 as an assistant professor of botany and plant pathology. He received "subsequent promotions to associate and full professor," over the next few years.

"Nine faculty in five departments at KSU began meeting in 1956 to discuss the need for a prairie area for ecological research to complement the prairie areas being used to study livestock production." Hulbert and other faculty drafted a report in 1958 that led to increased support for ecological prairie research.

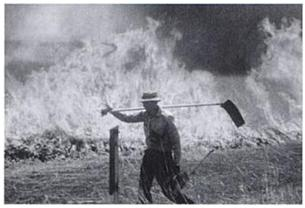
Lloyd Hulbert

Hulbert had a particular interest in researching the bluestem, or tallgrass, prairie, which "had existed in a state of dynamic balance for at least 10,000 years." Hulbert hoped to learn about how the prairie was "self-sustaining and stable, yet in less than 200 years of agricultural use, the same land ha[d] begun to change. Vital nutrients [were] constantly [being] lost. Erosion ha[d] become serious." The highly productive agricultural zone—the 'corn belt' is located where there used to be prairie so it was very important to learn about the soil in that area.

In the mid-1960s Hulbert spent 18 months trying to find an area of prairie that would be suitable for his ecological research. Once an appropriate area was found, Lloyd Hulbert and biologist Richard Marzolf went to Washington D.C. to try to get federal funds, but were unsuccessful. The Nature Conservancy was interested in providing funds and after negotiations with landowners, the first portion of land was bought. It "consist[ed] of 916 acres in Geary County north of Interstate 70 [and] was transferred to the stewardship of Kansas State University by the Nature Conservancy on 30 December 1971."

More land was bought over the next several years, also by the Nature Conservancy (through an initially anonymous donor, posthumously credited to Catherine Ordway), so that the total land was 8,616 acres (34.87 km^{2}) in 1977. This land was named Konza Prairie at the request of Catherine Ordway. Konza Prairie is still used to perform long term research carried out by KSU biology department and also allows visiting scientists to come to conduct their own research. Hulbert was the first director of Konza Prairie, and served as director until his death.

=== Research ===
Hulbert was known for his research of bluestem prairies, prairie-forest relationships, fire on grassland and fire's effects on soil. Many experiments that were done on Konza Prairie were about how fire affects the prairie ecosystem as a whole. Numerous plots of land were set aside and it was decided how often each plot of land would be burned—whether it be each year, every two years, every four years, every ten years or never burned.

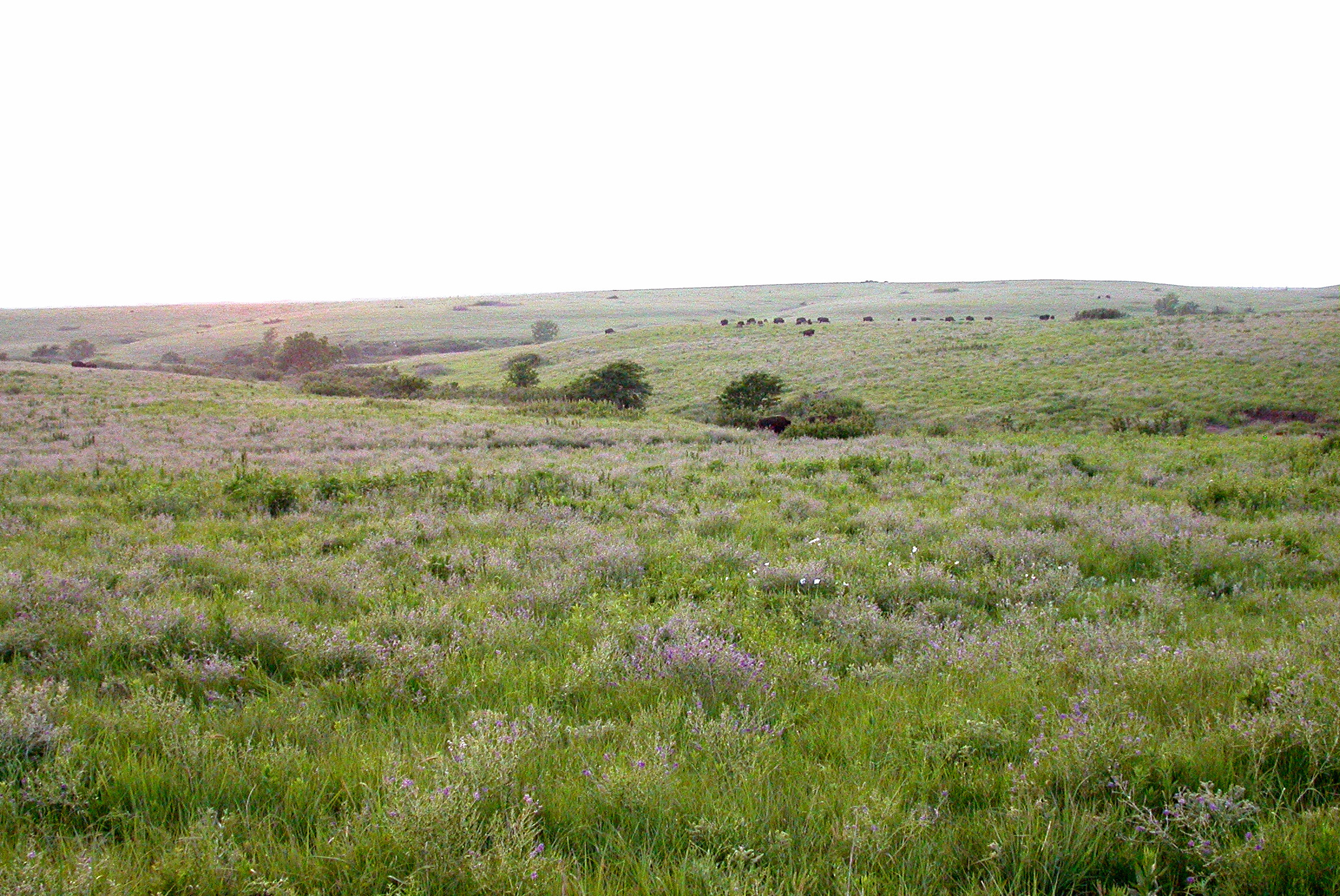
Konza Prairie Biological Research Station

One experiment was about how burning affects increased production and flowering. There were several variables tested to try to find out why there was such an increase in production and flowering after burning, variables such as warming of the soil, an increase in the surface light intensity and an increase of ammonium nitrate in the soil. These variables were all found to increase production and flowering, but not as much as increases after a burning.

Another experiment of Hulbert's, that took place over ten years, was about how highland and lowland, as well as fire, affects the biomass produced by the prairie. The biomass was much larger on lowland sites that had been burned than on lowland sites that had not, but there was only a small difference between highland sites being burned or not burned. Unburned areas, however, had much greater amounts of woody plants.

== Family and later life ==
Hulbert was given several awards for his dedication in the study of bluestem prairie and work in helping to create Konza Prairie. He received the Nature Conservancy's Oak Leaf Award in 1977 and the President's Stewardship Award in 1978. He was also awarded the prestigious Sol Feinstone Environmental Award (given annually "to only five individuals whose voluntary efforts contribute to environmental improvements") in 1986. He and his wife Jean had four sons, Steven, Mark, Thomas, and John.1. Hulbert died on May 23, 1986 (at the age of 68). He died while in the Bahamas, trying to find a treatment for his cancer.

== Publications of Lloyd Hulbert ==
- Gibson, DJ., C.C. Freeman, and L.C. Hulbert. Effects of small mammal and invertebrate herbivory on plant species richness and abundance in tall grass prairie (in preparation).

Hulbert, L.C. 1988. Causes of fire effects in tallgrass prairie. Ecology 69(1):46-58.

- Gibson, D.J. and L.C. Hulbert. 1987. Effects of fire, topography and year-to-year climatic variation on species composition in tallgrass prairie. Vegetation 72: 175-185.
- Abrams, M.D. and L.C. Hulbert. Effect of topographic position and fire on species composition in tallgrass prairie in northeast Kansas. American Midland Naturalist 117(2):442-445.
- Abrams, M.D., A.K. Knapp, and L.C. Hulbert. 1986. A ten-year record of aboveground biomass in a Kansas tallgrass prairie: Effects of fire and topographic position. American Journal of Botany 73 (10): 1509–1515.
- Hulbert L.C. 1986. Fire effects on tallgrass prairie. Pages 138–142 in Proceedings of the Ninth North American Prairie 'Conference (G.K. Clambey and R.H. Pemble, editors). Tri-College University Center for Environmental Studies, North Dakota State University; 1984. Fargo, North Dakota.
- Knapp. A.K. and L.C. Hulbert. 1986. Production. density and height of flower stalks of three grasses in annually burned and unburned eastern Kansas tall grass prairie: A four-year record. The Southwestern Naturalist 31(2):235-241.
- Freeman. C.C. and L.C. Hulbert. 1985. An annotated list of the vascular flora of Konza Prairie Research Natural Area, Kansas. Transactions of the Kansas Academy of Science 88 (3-4):84-115.
- Knapp, A.K., M.D. Abrams, and L.C. Hulbert. 1985. An evaluation of beta attenuation for estimating aboveground biomass a tallgrass prairie. Journal of Range Management 38 (6):556-558.
- Hulbert. L.C. 1985. History and use of Konza Prairie Research Natural Area. The Prairie Scout 5:63-95 .
- Hulbert, LC. and J.K. Wilson. 1983. Fire interval effects on flowering of grasses in Kansas bluestem prairie. Pages 255- 257 in Proceedings of the Seventh North American Prairie Conference (C.L. Kucera, editor). Southwest Missouri State University; 1980. Springfield, Missouri.
- Brehm, R.W. and L.C. Hulbert. 1980. Decomposition of litter in Kansas bluestem prairie. Transactions of the Kansas Academy of Science 83(1):33-35.
- Hulbert. L.C. 1978. Natural area needs for range research. Pages 263-265 in First International Rangeland Congress Proceedings (D.N. Hyder, editor). 1978. Denver. Colorado.
- Hulbert, L.C. 1978. Controlling experimental bluestem prairie fires. Pages 169-171 in Fifth Midwest Prairie Conference Proceedings (D.C. Glenn-Lewin and R.Q. Landers, Jr., editors). Extension Courses and Conferences, Iowa State University; 1976. Ames, Iowa.
- Dokken, D.A. and L.c. Hulbert. 1978. Effect of standing dead on stem density in bluestem prairie. Pages 78–81 in Fifth Midwest Prairie Conference Proceedings (D.C. Glenn-Lewin and R.Q. Landers, Jr., editors). Extension Courses and Conferences, Iowa State University; 1976. Ames, Iowa.
- Bragg, T.B. and L.C. Hulbert. 1976. Woody plant invasion of unburned Kansas bluestem prairie. Journal of Range Man¬agement 29(1): 19-24.
- Bellah, R.G. and L.C. Hulbert. 1974. Forest succession on the Republican River floodplain in Clay County, Kansas. The Southwestern Naturalist 19(2):155-166.
- Hulbert, L.C. 1973. Management of Konza Prairie to approximate pre-whiteman fire influences. Pages 14–17 in Third Midwest Prairie Conference Proceedings (L.C. Hulbert, editor). Kansas State University: 1972. Manhattan, Kansas.
- Hulbert, L.C. (editor). 1973. Third Midwest Prairie Conference Proceedings. Kansas State University; 1972. Manhattan, Kansas.
- Alizai, . and L.C. Hulbert. 1970. Effects of soil texture on evaporative loss and available water in semi-arid climates. Soil Science 110(5):328-332.
- Hulbert, L.C. 1969. Fire and litter effects in undisturbed bluestem prairie in Kansas. Ecology 50(5):874-877.
- Robel, R.I., J.N. Briggs, A.D. Dayton, and L.C. Hulbert. 1970. Relationships between visual obstruction measurements and weight of grassland vegetation. Journal of Range Management 23(4):295-297.
- Oehme, R. W., W.E. Bailie, and L.C. Hulbert. 1968. Astragalus mollissimus (locoweed) toxicosis of horses in western Kansas. Journal of the American Veterinary Medical Association J52(3):271-278.
- Conservation Committee, Kansas Academy of Science, L.C. Hulbert (chair). 1966. A Plan for Natural Areas in Kansas. Kansas Academy of Science Transactions 69(1): 1-10. .
- Hulbert, L.C. and F. W. Oehme. 1960. Plants poisonous to livestock. Selected plants of the United States and Canada of 'Importance to veterinarians, 1st Edition (1960; 54 pp.), 2nd Edition (1963: 102 pp), 3rd Edition (1968; 138 pp.). Kansas State University Press, Manhattan, Kansas.
- Hulbert, L.C. 1963. Gates' phonological records of 132 plants at Manhattan, Kansas, 1926–1955. Transactions of the Kansas Academy of Science 66(1):82-106.
- Hulbert, L. C. 1955. Ecological studies of Bromus tectorum and other annual bromegrasses, Ecological Monographs L,)(2):181-313.
