= Gypsum Creek =

Stream in Saline and McPherson County, Kansas, U.S.

Coordinates: 38.860556°N 97.412250°W

Gypsum Creek is a stream in Saline County, Kansas and McPherson County, Kansas, in the United States. Gypsum Creek is a tributary of the Smoky Hill River, runs south to north, and is approximately 40 miles (64 km) long. The Maxwell Wildlife Refuge, which has herds of bison and elk is located in the headwaters of the Creek in McPherson County.

Gypsum Creek was likely named from reports of deposits of gypsum discovered on the Coronado expedition.

== See also ==
- List of rivers of Kansas
