= Tallgrass Prairie bison herd =

Preserve in central Kansas

- Herd
- Interactive map of Tallgrass Prairie bison herd
- Coordinates: 38°25′58″N 96°33′32″W
- Location: Tallgrass Prairie National Preserve
- Website: Official website

The Tallgrass Prairie bison herd is a population of American bison (Bison bison) inhabiting the Tallgrass Prairie National Preserve in central Kansas. It is a public bison herd that has little evidence of cattle introgression.

== History ==
Bison were reintroduced to the Tallgrass Prairie National Preserve in October 2009 when seven male and six female bison from Wind Cave National Park in South Dakota were transported to the 1,100-acre Windmill Pasture (450 ha). Two of the transported bulls died after arriving in Kansas and were replaced by two males, also sourced from the Wind Cave bison herd, purchased from Dunn Ranch in Missouri. The Tallgrass Prairie bison herd is considered a satellite herd of the Wind Cave bison herd to promote genetic diversity among federal herds. It is one of only a few public bison herds that show little evidence of cattle introgression. The conservation of bison is an ongoing, diverse effort to bring bison back from the brink of extinction. The 2020 Bison Conservation Initiative by the Department of the Interior has five central goals: wild, healthy bison herds; genetic conservation; shared stewardship; ecological restoration; and cultural restoration.

== Size and status ==
The population's first calf was born on May 9, 2010. The herd numbered twenty-three animals in December 2013. Plans to transplant an additional twelve bison from the Wind Cave bison herd were delayed by the United States federal government shutdown of 2013. The transfer is now expected to occur in 2014, bringing the herd closer to its planned size of 75 to 100 animals. An outbreak of Mycoplasma bovis killed 22 animals in the fall of 2021.
