= Fermilab bison herd =

Ecological restoration project in Illinois, US

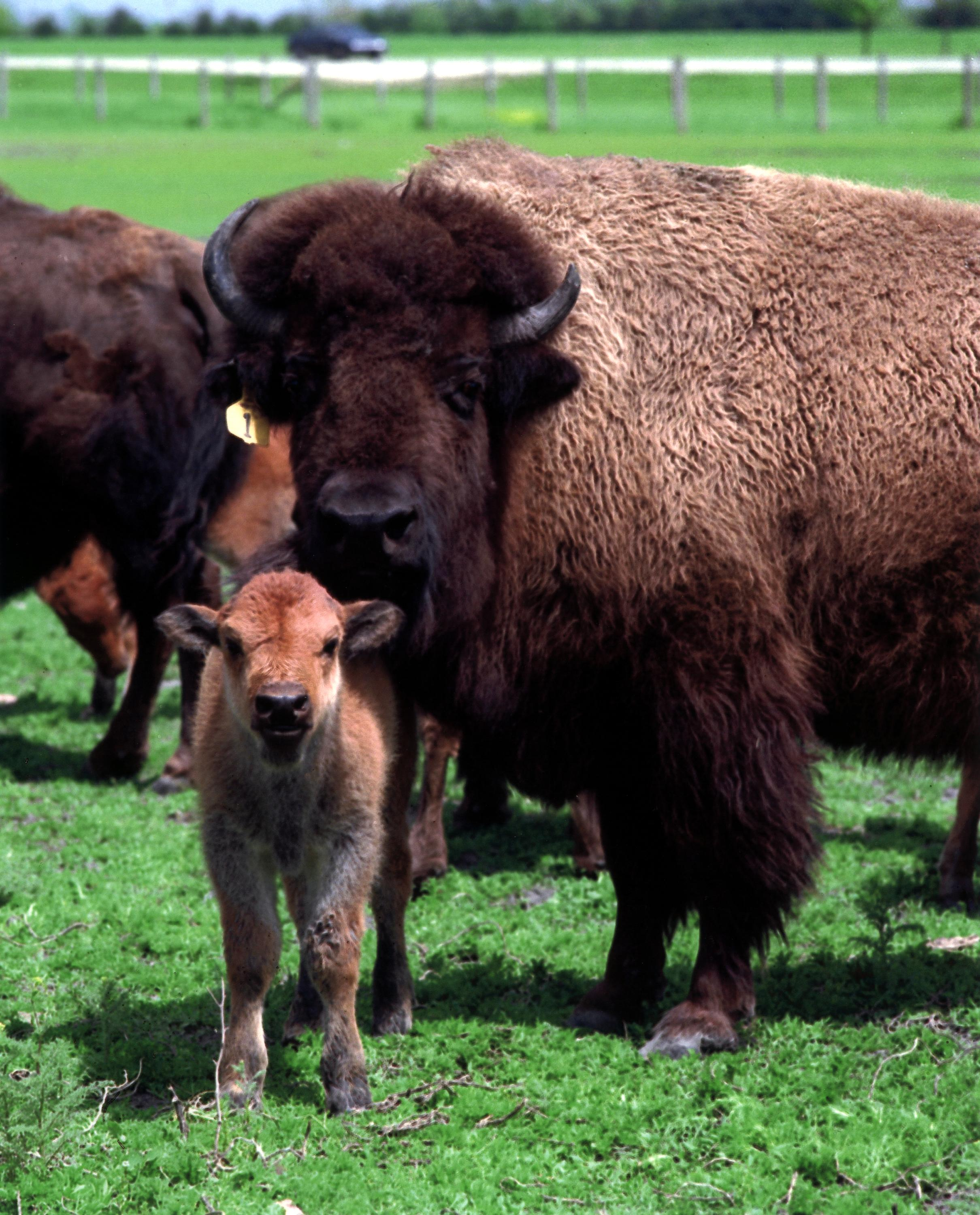
DOE photo of cow and calf, 2013

The Fermilab bison herd was established in 1969 at the U.S. national laboratory in Batavia, Illinois, about 34 mi (55 km) west of Chicago, under the leadership of physicist, amateur architect and Wyoming native Robert R. Wilson. The herd grazes an 800-acre (320 ha; 3.2 km^{2}) pasture adjacent to the Fermilab prairie, which sits atop the accelerator's underground Main Ring and Tevatron. The herd usually averages around 25 individuals; as of spring 2022, the head count of the herd was 32 individuals.

== History and ecology ==
A bull and four cows were first brought to the Fermi National Accelerator Laboratory as a visual reminder of the idea science is a frontier. In 1971, the Illinois Department of Natural Resources added 21 head. The bison herd added a utopian dimension to a physics lab that was associated in the mind of the general public with the terror of the Bomb. The herd was also explicitly a tourist attraction. The bison were meant to be classic symbol of Americana, familiar from Western-genre stories and films, for visitors from overseas; for domestic visitors, the opportunity to visit the bison marked the lab as an accessible populist space, rather than as a secretive quasi-military government installation. The historian Edward Tenner suggested in Wilson Quarterly that the curved towers of the Alan H. Rider-designed Fermilab admin building represent a cathedral of science and innovation that, in combination with the bison herd and the prairie restoration, projected "exuberant hope for the future [bound with] profound respect for human and natural heritage." The animals are contained by two layers of fencing, 12 ft (3.7 m) apart and with one ring tall enough to block a potentially 6 ft (1.8 m) vertical leap. The fences are marked with warning signs designating the grounds as a dangerous high radiation area, which serve as a further deterrent despite there being no radiation danger to civilians at Fermilab.

The Fermilab herd is one of 12 federally managed "buffalo" herds in the United States. Most of the federal herds are managed by the United States Fish and Wildlife Service and partners; Fermilab's herd is solely managed by the Department of Energy. All of the government-owned herds are considered conservation herds; there were about 50 conservation herds in North America circa 2006. (Hundreds of thousands of other bison are owned by commercial ranching operations.)

Both the bison herd and the prairie are part of Fermi National Accelerator Laboratory Environmental Research Park. The Fermilab herd of DuPage County, and two other herds established during the 21st century at Nachusa Grasslands (Ogle County–Lee County) and Midewin National Tallgrass Prairie (Will County) represent the first bison to live in Illinois since the early 1800s. Testing has found that the Fermilab display herd of indigenous Bison bison does not have any introgression of either mitochondrial or nuclear DNA from domestic cattle (Bos taurus).

Twitter-suggested names for a bison calf born at the lab in 2016 included Higgs Bison, Bison Tennial, Niels Bohrson and Neil DeGrass Bison.

== Management ==
The herd got up to 160 head in the 1990s but is now kept to about 20 to 25 animals. The herd's bulls are changed out from time to time in order to prevent inbreeding depression. The bison get annual veterinary checkups but are otherwise left to their own devices. There is a bison cemetery on the laboratory grounds where they bury animals that die of old age; other animals are auctioned off to ranchers in order to maintain a herd size appropriate for the carrying capacity of the site. The Fermi herdsmen responsible for the bison, in cooperation with the lab's Roads and Grounds Department, work out of a converted dairy building that dates to around 1900.

== Access ==
According to one site caretaker, the most important thing to know about bison is "leave them alone."

Fans can observe the herd via a webcam. Visitors to the site must show valid ID; U.S. state driver's licenses must be Real ID-compliant after May 3, 2023. Entrance gates are located at Pine Street Entrance in Batavia or Batavia Road in Warrenville. Summer hours are 8 a.m. to 8 p.m. The Lederman Science Center opens at 9 a.m. Monday through Saturday.

== See also ==
- Camp Pendleton bison herd
