= Camp Pendleton bison herd =

Established California, 1973

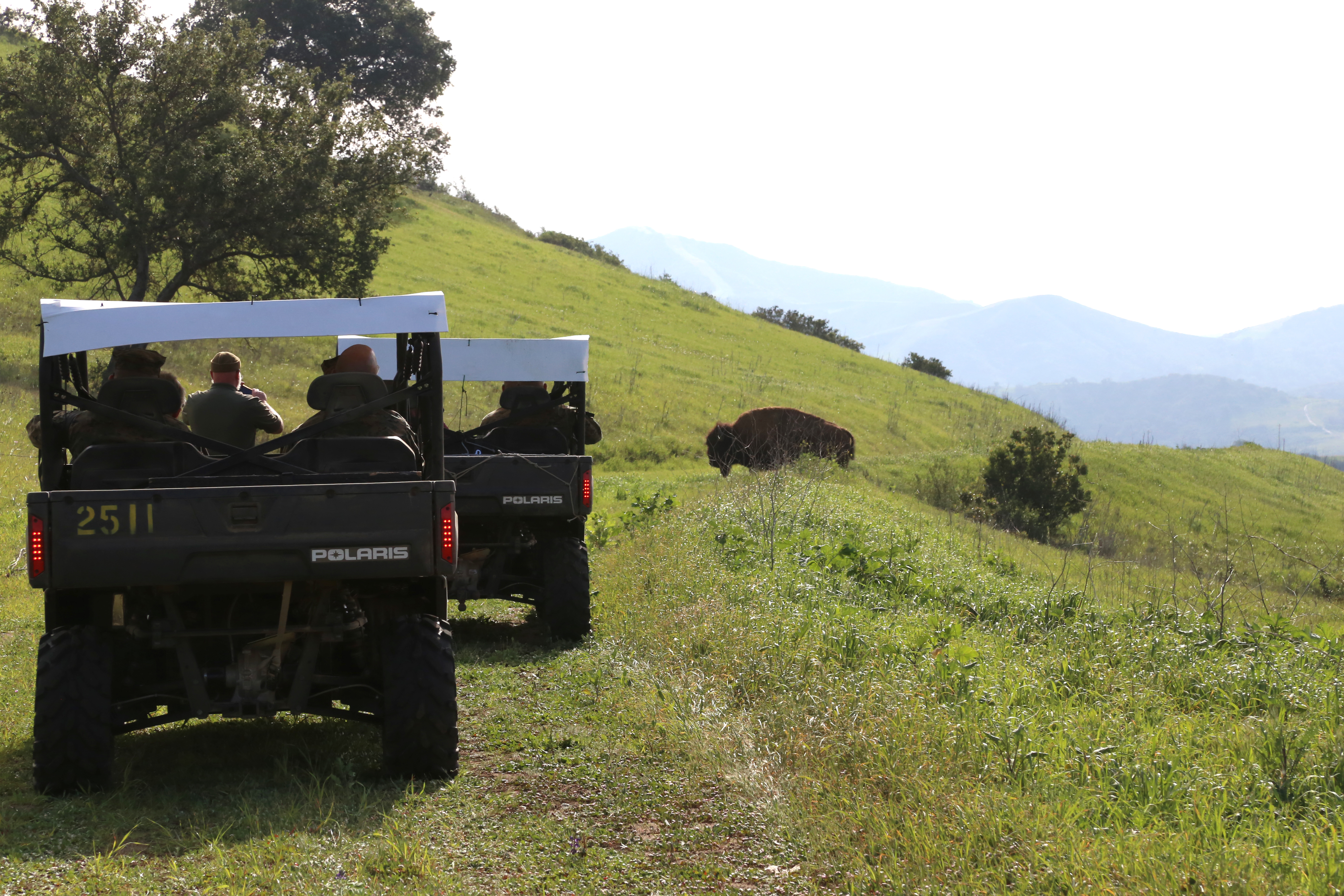
Marines and civilian personnel brake for a male bison near Jardine Canyon at Camp Pendleton, February 2015 (USMC photo)

The Camp Pendleton bison herd is a conservation herd of approximately 100 introduced American bison that live at United States Marine Corps Base Camp Pendleton in San Diego County, California. The Camp Pendleton herd and the Catalina Island herd are the only two wild-roaming herds of American bison in California.

== History and ecology ==
The Camp Pendleton herd is one of the dozen bison herds that are owned by the U.S. federal government and managed by an assortment of agencies including the National Park Service, the Forest Service, the Department of Energy, and the Department of Defense (by way of the Pendleton Game Warden's Office). Camp Pendleton is the largest open space on the California coast between the border and Santa Barbara. The 126,000-acre (51,000 ha) base is 95 percent undeveloped, has a river running through it, and has multiple spring-fed ponds. At last count, Camp Pendleton was host to an estimated 1,000 types of plants and animals, including 250 bird species, 60 reptiles and amphibians, and 60 mammals, among which are 19 federal or state-listed threatened or endangered species.

The Camp Pendleton herd was founded by a dozen or so bison from the San Diego Zoo that were delivered in fits and starts between 1973 and 1978. The first set of four came in October 1973, followed in short order by six more. Two more females arrived from the zoo in 1976. The first calf native to the base was born August 1975 to a pair dubbed Adam and Eve. Another pioneering bull was named Ferdinand. Four calves had been born on the base by 1978. By 1987, Adam had become the dominant bull bison at Camp Pendleton, with a larger harem than any of the other 25 male bison on base. The herd now numbers 90 to 150 individuals. (The bison do not muster properly to be counted off, but aerial surveys keep track of their general numbers.) On the average, the head count of the Camp Pendleton bison herd increases by eight percent annually. As of 2008, the herd showed no signs of cattle DNA introgression.

The bison mostly stick to a 38,000-acre (15,000 ha) zone in the northeastern corner of the base between Basilone Road and Roblar Road. Located about 12 miles (19 km) inland, their preferred pasturage is a relatively higher-elevation zone described as "an isolated land of rolling hills dotted by sycamores, live oaks and Engelmann oaks, with a few reed-lined ponds where the animals can drink." They can be seen periodically along isolated stretches of the base's Basilone Road. The herd often lingers near Margarita Peak, in the Case Springs area of the base, and are a familiar sight to the firefighters stationed there. They could theoretically enter the neighboring Cleveland National Forest but seem to be deterred by steep terrain and dense brush. As one account put it, migration to the forest would necessitate "crossing San Mateo Canyon, walking up a creek bed and then climbing 3,000 feet (910 m). The burly bison are poor hikers."

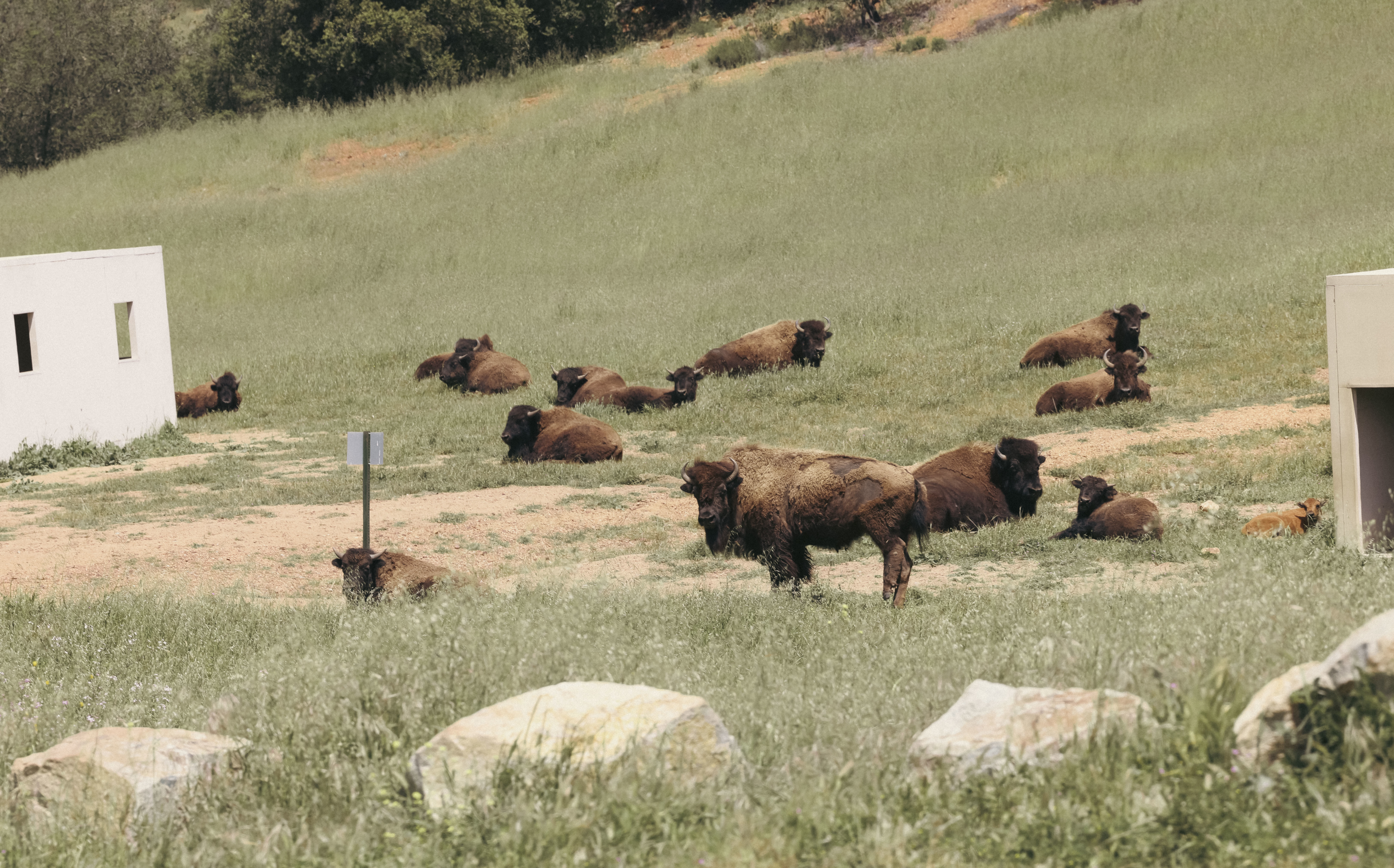
Plains bison rest at an "abandoned Military Operations on Urbanized Terrain (MOUT) town" built at Camp Pendleton (USMC photo by Shaina Jupiter, 2023)

The bison are attracted to the so-called "impact areas" where live-fire exercises are conducted and thus the bison regularly disrupt planned training. When the bison wander onto USMC firing ranges, air horns are used to disperse them peacefully. If that does not work, training exercises are suspended until the bison move to safety, out of the line of fire. One bison may have died from eating a jagged piece of metal, probably a bullet. Some bison have also been seen with leg injuries, possibly from unexploded ordnance. Camp Pendleton bison have also been killed in vehicle collisions. The base subsequently posted "bison crossing" warning signs (some of which were quickly stolen and had to be replaced with less-desirable versions). The bison otherwise have no natural predators on the base; the California grizzly was extirpated many decades past, black bears are very rare visitors, and animals like bobcats and coyotes do not interact with bison.

The bison are an introduced species. Plains bison were not historically resident in California, but did range into similarly arid Arizona and New Mexico.

There are also bison herds at two Canadian military installations, Camp Wainwright and Primrose Lake Air Weapons Range.

== See also ==
- Conservation of American bison
- Fermilab bison herd
