= Catalina Island bison herd =

Introduced in 1924

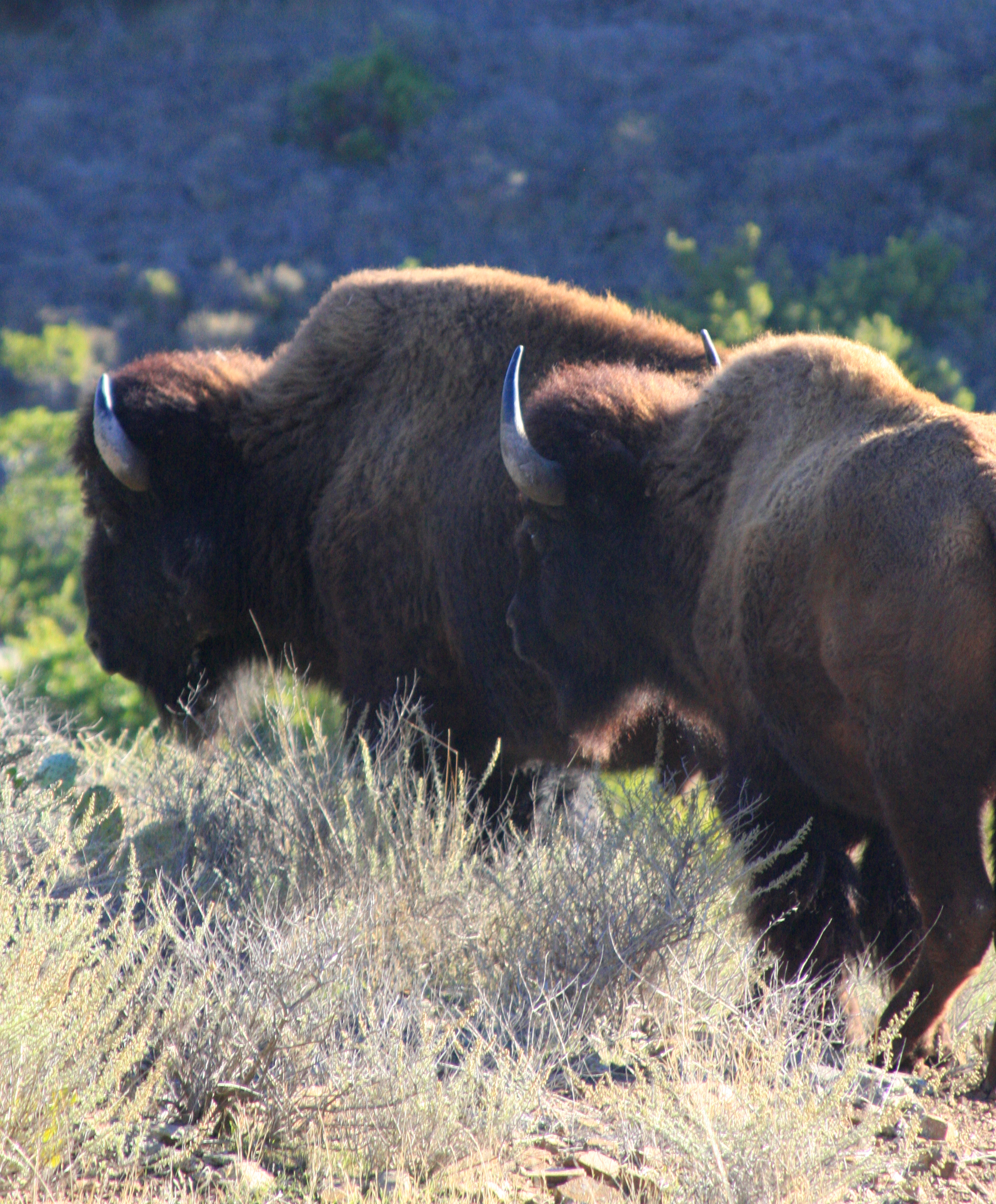
Bison on Catalina Island

The Catalina Island bison herd is a small group of introduced American bison living on Catalina Island off the coast of Southern California. In 1924, several bison were acquired for a film shoot and, before the end of 1925, brought to Catalina. The bison are now quite popular with the tourists. Some buildings have been painted with images of bison and decorated with bison weather vanes. Over the decades, the bison herd numbered as many as 600. The population currently numbers approximately 100.

== History ==
Registered as privately owned agricultural livestock in a fenced-restricted area, it has been commonly reported that the bison were imported in 1924 for the silent film version of Zane Grey's Western tale, The Vanishing American. However, the 1925 version of The Vanishing American does not contain any bison and shows no terrain that resembles Catalina, according to Jim Watson, columnist for The Catalina Islander newspaper. In an October 6, 1938 article in The Catalina Islander, he attributes the bison's arrival to the filming of The Thundering Herd, a silent film released in 1925. A September 1938 article in Nation's Business said the herd then numbered about 30 animals and was left behind with Wrigley's permission after a Lasky Western filmed on the island in 1925. Contemporaneous reports in the Los Angeles Times and New York Times state that The Thundering Herd used a collection of Yellowstone National Park animals herded together for the movie. Other shooting locations were the Sierra Nevada mountains and Calabasas.

AllAboutBison.com, citing newspaper sources and national herd records, argues that the bison were filmed in Yellowstone and then some surplus animals from that herd were sent to Catalina Island by Lasky executives as a bison savings account of sorts, to be used as future events warrant. On December 11, 1924 (based on the dateline in several newspaper accounts) 16 bison of 86 culls from the Yellowstone herd (which had numbered 780 on August 1, 1924) had been sent to California (Note: The bison may have been shipped first to Providencia Ranch near Cahuenga Pass, then still-rustic land that Paramount used for filming from 1918 to 1927.) and then were headed to Catalina.

The contingent now bound for Hollywood will be active in completing this feature. When this is completed they will be released on Catalina Island.

Other animals culled that year went to cities, game preserves, forests, and private estates, plus a pair to Flo Zeigfield. Except for shipping and handling in the form of freight fees, the bison were free upon request, although supplies were limited.

A 1949 report on a bison roundup on the island claimed that it was in "1924, I think" that a film company left behind 13 "bulls and stags" in Skull Canyon. In 1934, Wrigley (Note: William Wrigley Jr. died in 1932 so this would presumably be Philip K. Wrigley) and his ranch staff bought 17 bison ("mostly cows") from Colorado. Five were sold to a resort in Arizona, and the other 12 were sent to the Los Angeles Stockyards and then shipped to the island by steamer.

A 1961 report in Sports Illustrated stated, "Buffalo (nobody calls them bison) roam the island in two herds. The first was left there 30-odd years ago after the filming of a western. The second was introduced a few years later in hopes of supplementing the original, but the two herds refused to mingle."

== Ecology and management ==
The bison herd is maintained and monitored by the Catalina Island Conservancy. Controlling the bison population is important for the island's ecological health. Bison are not native to Catalina Island. The Santa Catalina Island Conservancy makes sure that the number of bison on the island does not exceed the carrying capacity. In 2003, a study was conducted on the bison herd to estimate the carrying capacity of bison in several zones that the bison spend the most time in. The study developed options to prevent the bison from affecting native species, such as restricting bison to one or more zones or to get rid of all the bison from the island. The study found the bison's shaggy coats carry imported plants such as fennel which disrupt endemic species like St. Catherine's lace.

The 2003 study determined that a herd of between 150 and 200 would be good for the bison, and less ecologically damaging for the island. In the past, bison were routinely removed and sent to the mainland to auction. In 2004, the Conservancy partnered with the Morongo Band of Mission Indians, the Tongva (thought to be Catalina's original inhabitants some 7,000 years ago), and the Lakota tribe on the Rosebud Reservation in South Dakota. A hundred bison were relocated to the Great Plains.

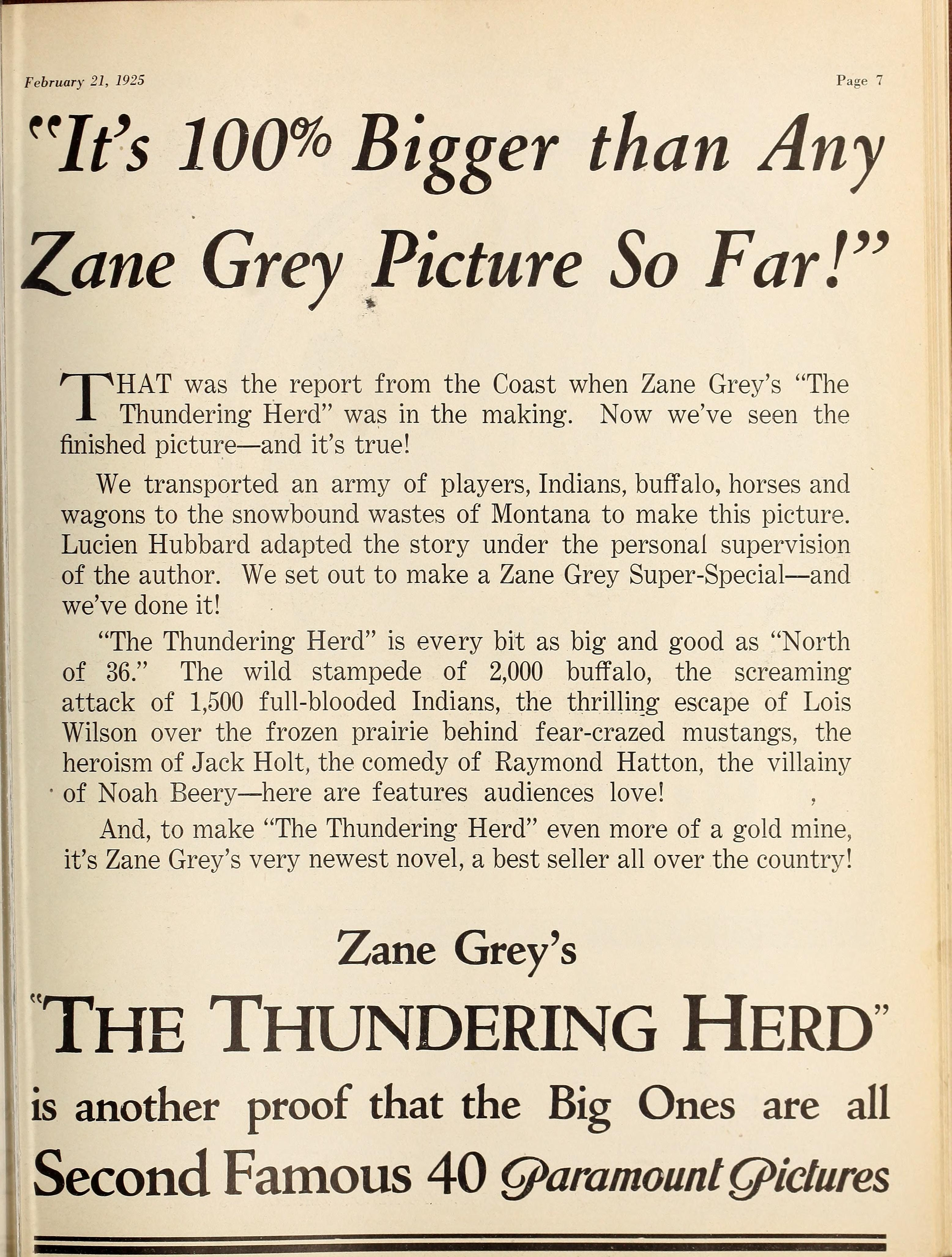
Paramount ad for The Thundering Herd (1925) states that the film used 2,000 bison for the stampede scene

Biologists found that the bison have genes from cattle in their ancestry in 2007. They also found that they have a smaller size, different length of legs, jaw-length overbite, low fertility, and behavioral problems (such as punctuated walking in tight circles).

Beginning in 2009, the herd was given animal birth control to maintain the population at around 150 animals. The current herd size is 80 (as of 2024), and the island's most recent bison birth occurred in 2013. Since the bison are a high-impact naturalized species whose action on the land disrupts ecological restoration programs, the current Catalina bison plan is leave the herd unbothered but to neither export nor import bison, and over time the population will decline to zero through natural attrition, sometime over the next 20 to 40 years.

== Bison-human interaction ==
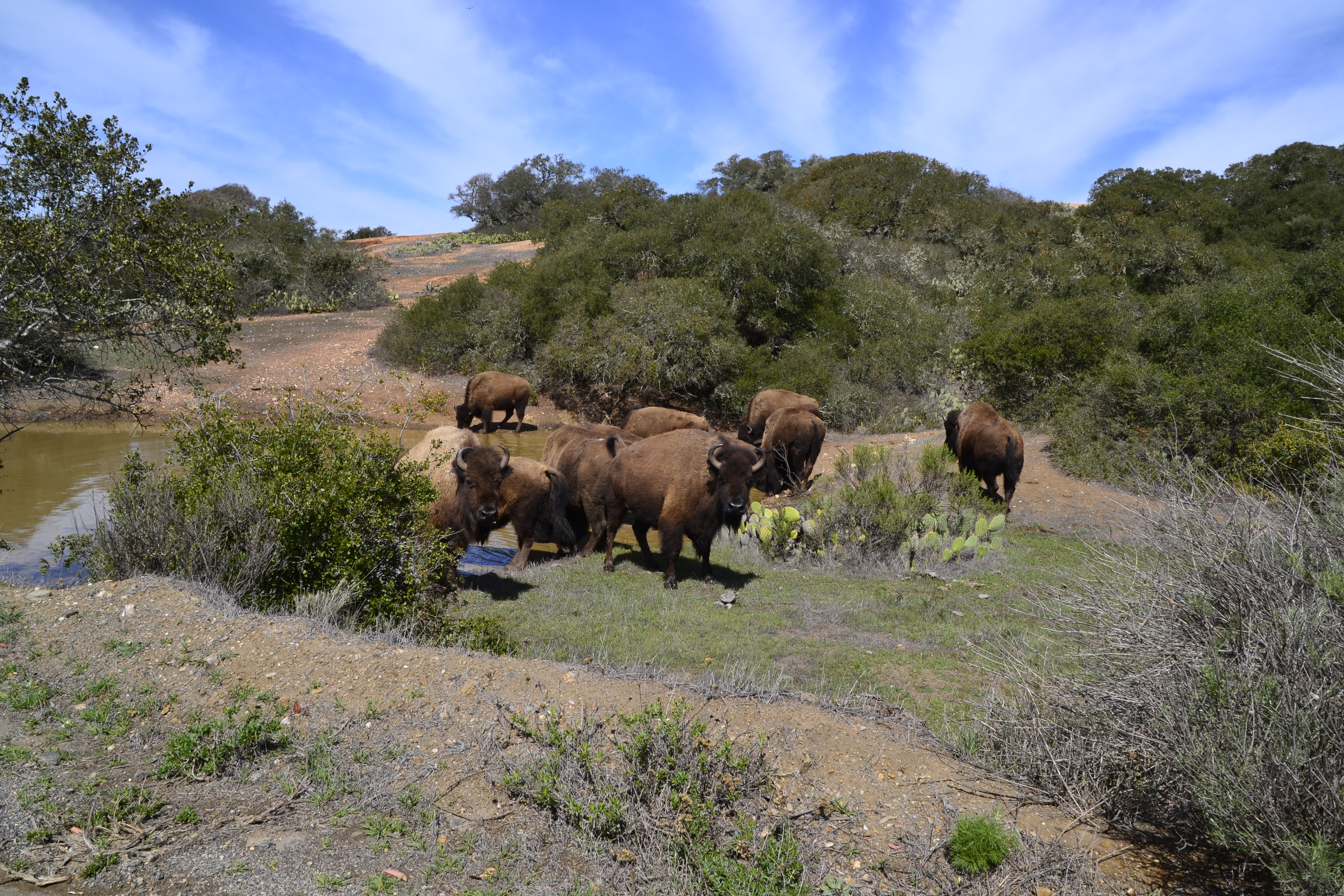
American Bison (Bison bison), Catalina

On August 26, 2015, a contract worker from American Conservation Experience was injured by a bison while working near Tower Peak on Catalina Island. On February 17, 2018, a man camping at the Little Harbor Campground was gored by a bison.

== See also ==
- Conservation of American bison
- Catalina Bird Park
- Camp Pendleton bison herd
