= Tallgrass Prairie National Preserve =

Protected area in Kansas, US

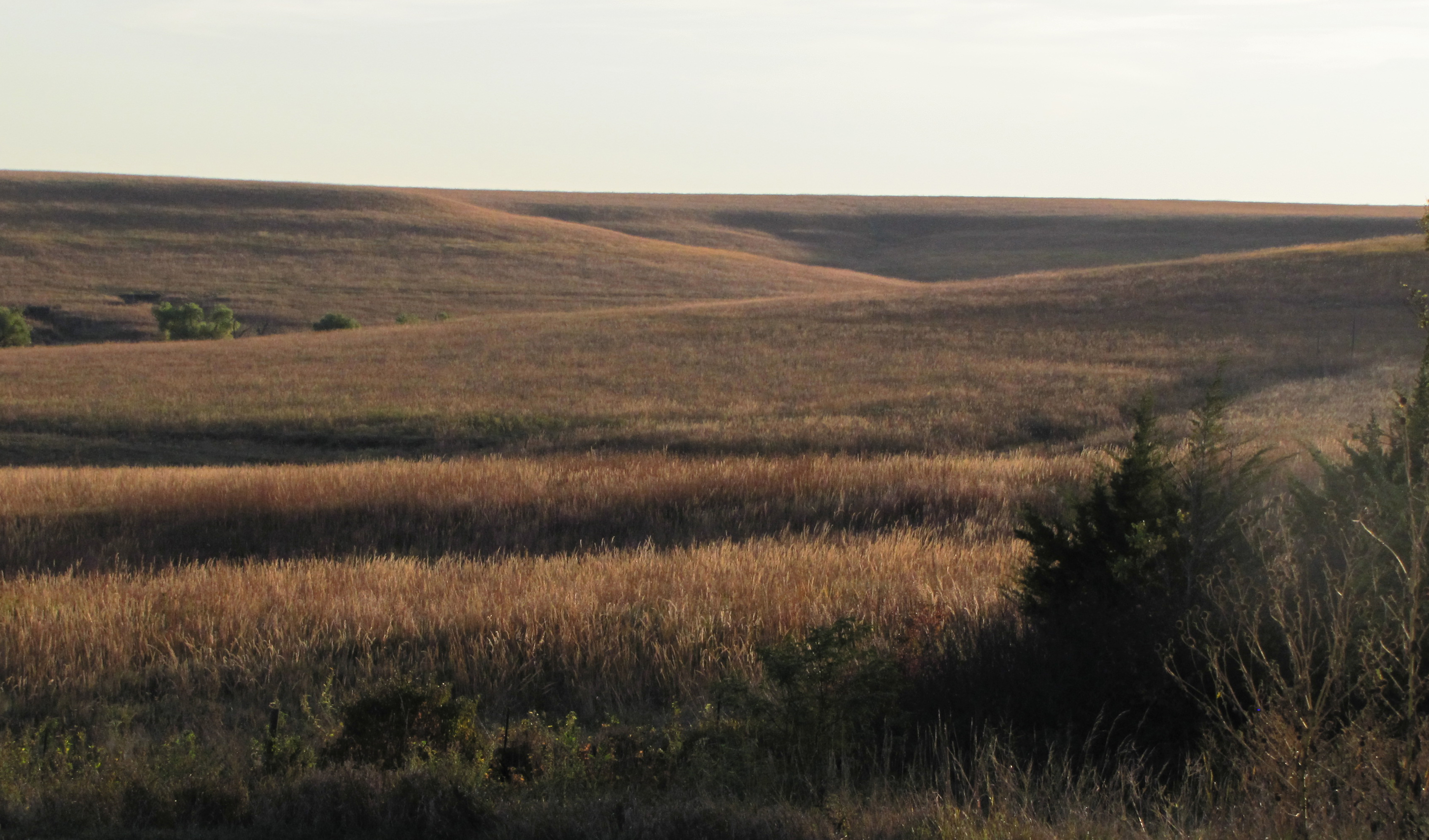
- Tallgrass Prairie National Preserve

- Location within Kansas Location within the United States
- Location: Chase County, Kansas
- Nearest city: Strong City, Kansas
- Coordinates: 38°25′58″N 96°33′32″W
- Area: 10,882 acres (44.04 km^{2})
- Established: November 12, 1996
- Visitors: 29,009 (in 2020)
- Governing body: National Park Service, The Nature Conservancy
- Website: Tallgrass Prairie National Preserve

Tallgrass Prairie National Preserve is a United States National Preserve located in the Flint Hills region of Kansas, north of Strong City. The preserve protects a nationally significant example of the once vast tallgrass prairie ecosystem. Of the 400,000 square miles (1,000,000 km^{2}) of tallgrass prairie that once covered the North American continent, less than 5% remains, primarily in the Flint Hills. Since 2009, the preserve has been home to the Tallgrass Prairie bison herd.

== Description ==
The NPS and The Nature Conservancy work toward preservation of the tallgrass prairie, while sharing the story of ranching legacy, American Indian history, and the diverse tallgrass prairie ecosystem in the heart of the scenic Flint Hills of Kansas.

There are over 40 miles (64 km) of maintained hiking trails in the preserve allowing visitors access to the tallgrass prairie. During the summer, narrated bus tours of the prairie are offered.

On January 29, 2008, Tallgrass Prairie National Preserve was named as one of the 8 Wonders of Kansas by the Kansas Sampler Foundation.

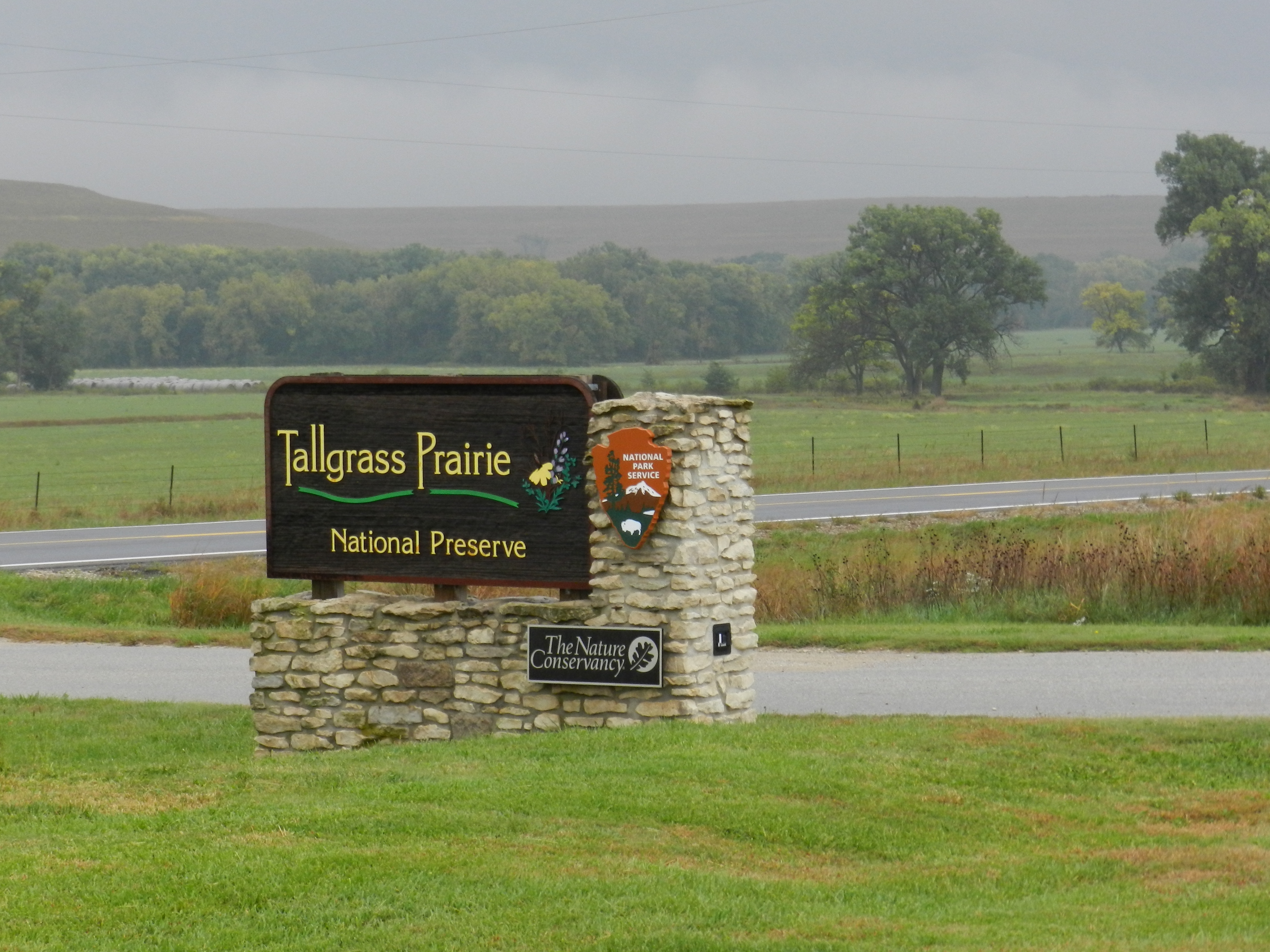
Entrance (2014)

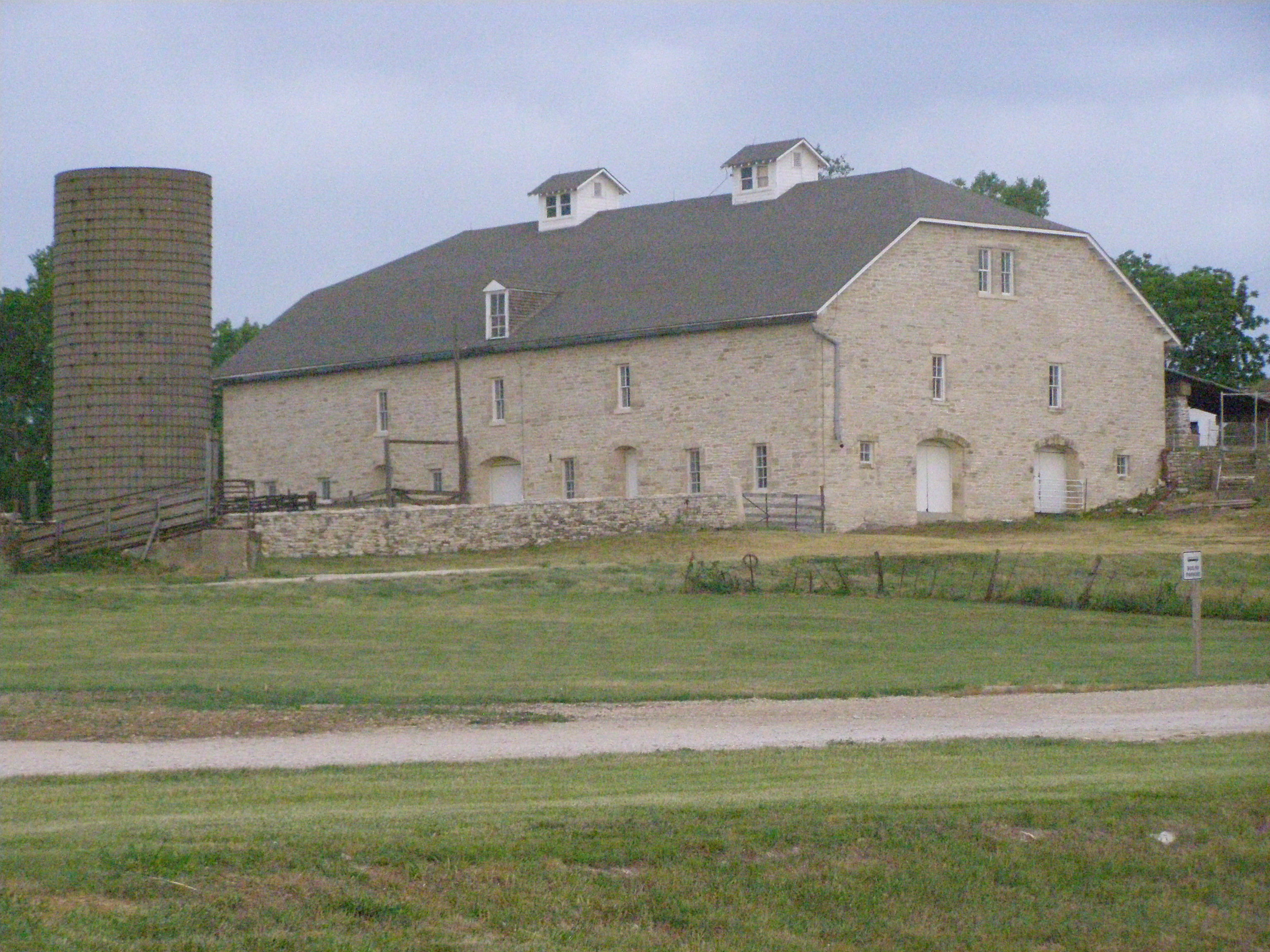
Limestone barn (2012)

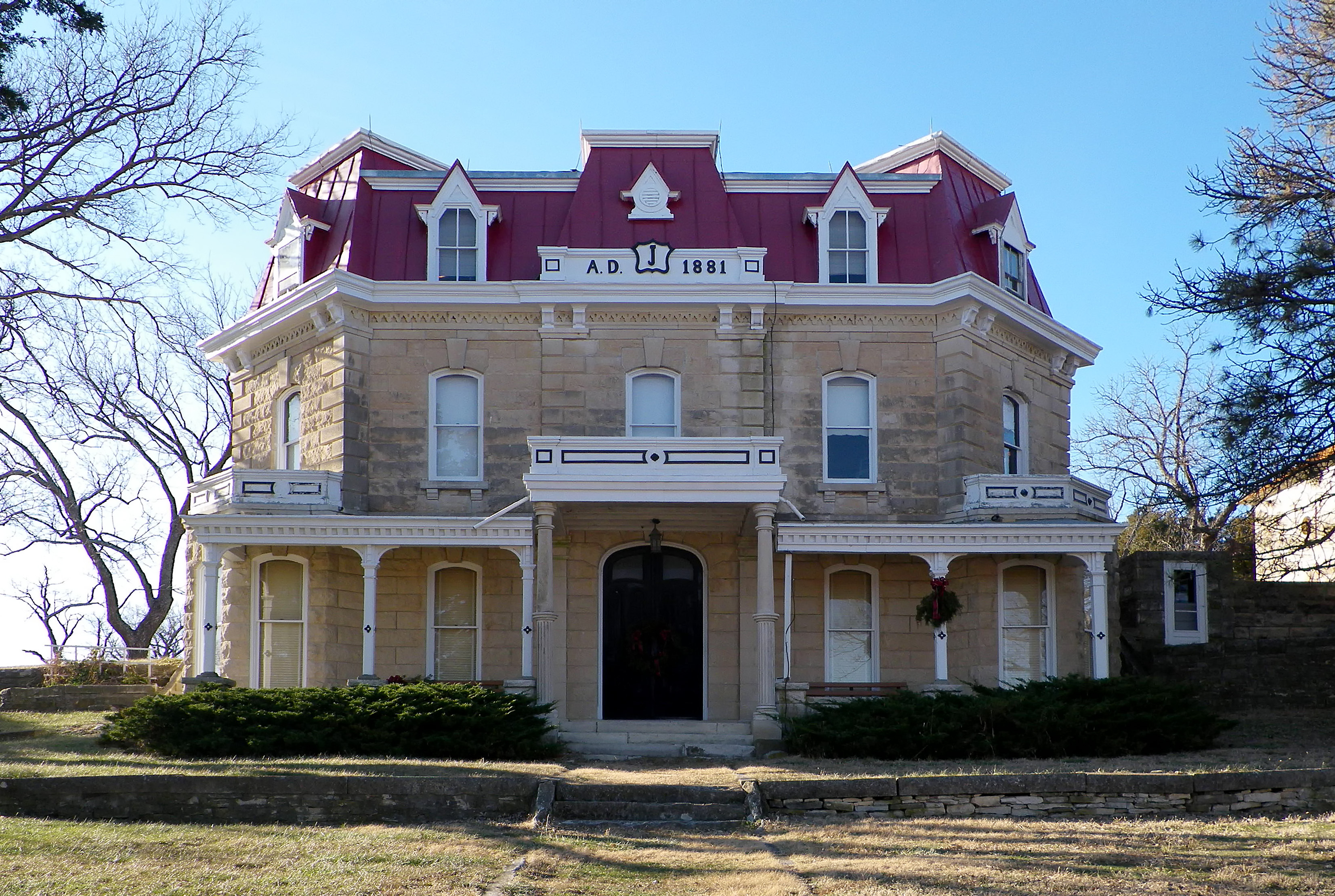
Main house of Spring Hill Ranch (2012)

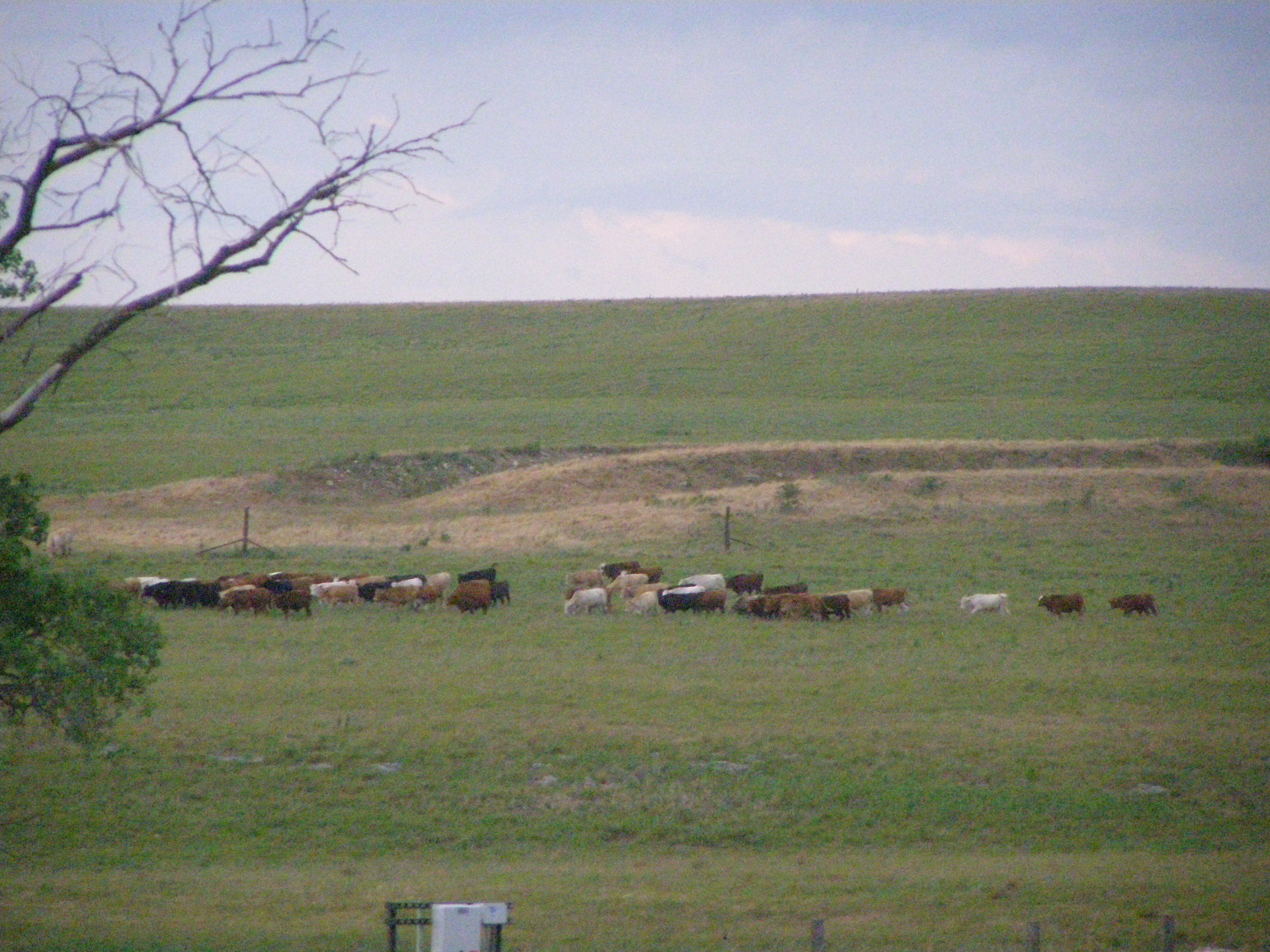
Tallgrass prairie

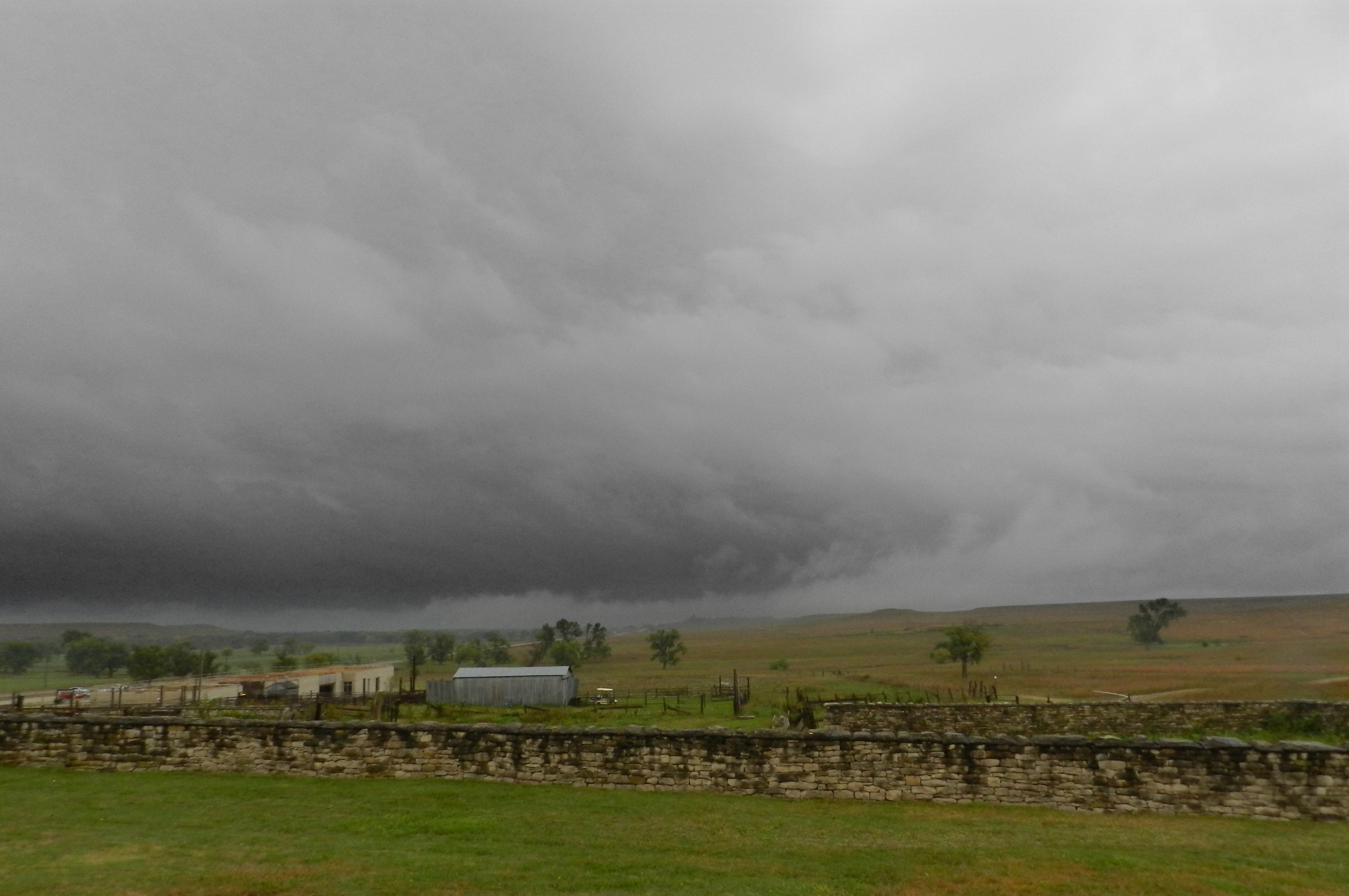
Stormy sky, Tallgrass Prairie National Preserve

== Ranch history ==
Development of Spring Hill Ranch began in 1878, with land purchases in the Flint Hills by Stephen F. Jones, a cattle rancher originally from Tennessee. He completed the ranch headquarters in 1881, and was one of the early adopters in the region of enclosed ranching, in which cattle movements are limited by stone walls, fences, or barbed wire. This was a marked change that swept across the Plains in the 1880s, caused in large part by overgrazing in open range operations. Over the years that followed his initial purchase, Jones expanded the ranch to a size of 7,000 acres (2,800 ha). The Second Empire style ranch house was built for Jones in 1881 at an estimated cost of $25,000. Jones was also responsible for construction of the Lower Fox Creek School, built on land he donated. Jones used the ranch to grow herds of purebred cattle of several breeds, as well as some purebred breeds of hogs and sheep. Jones sold the ranch in 1888 to Barney Lantry.

The Lantry family kept the ranch until 1904, primarily raising thoroughbred cattle. Spring Hill, the core of their holdings, was eventually divided up into smaller parcels. It was reassembled in a series of purchases executed in 1935 by George Davis, a grain dealer from Kansas City. Following Davis's death in 1955, the property was eventually put into a trust, and operated as the Z-Bar Ranch.

Historic interest in the property began in the 1960s, when local groups organized the restoration of the Lower Fox Creek School. The ranch complex was listed on the National Register of Historic Places in 1971, one of the first listings in the state. The National Audubon Society acquired an option to purchase the property in 1988, but this expired in 1990. It aroused wider interest in the property, resulting in its eventual acquisition by the National Park Trust. The entire ranch property was designated a National Historic Landmark District in 1997, primarily for its association with Jones and the end of the open range ranching era.

The 10,882-acre (4,404 ha) Spring Hill/Z-Bar Ranch was purchased by the National Park Trust in 1994. Legislation introduced in 1991 called for the creation of the Preserve, but local interests objected to the condition that the National Park Service would own it all. U.S. Senator Nancy Kassebaum convened a group of stakeholders to seek agreement on the formula for a tallgrass prairie park. The group began work in January 1992, and a different model for a national park emerged; it would be a public/private partnership, managed by the National Park Service, but the land privately owned.

== Preserve history ==
In 1994, Senators Kassebaum and Bob Dole introduced Senate bill S. 2412 in Congress, which would allow the Federal government to create a national preserve under the public/private partnership ownership arrangement. The bill limited National Park Service ownership to no more than 180 acres (73 ha) of the preserve, the remainder owned by the National Park Trust; both would manage the new park cooperatively. On November 12, 1996, the bill became Pub. L. 104–333 (text) (PDF), later codified under 16 USC 698.

On September 20, 2002, the National Park Trust donated approximately 32 acres (13 ha) to the National Park Service; it included the 1881 historic ranch house, limestone barn and outbuildings, and one-room schoolhouse. The National Park Trust worked with the National Park Service to plan and develop the park from 1996 to 2005.

Though the National Park Trust was named in the legislation, the law allowed for successor non-profits to own the land and continue the unique public/private ownership and management relationship. So, in 2005, the National Park Trust sold the approximate 10,862 acres (4,396 ha) to The Nature Conservancy. Additionally Texas billionaire Ed Bass owns grazing rights to nearly 10,000 acres (4,000 ha) until 2035; his cattle dot much of the hills and valleys of the preserve.

== Management ==
The National Park Service and The Nature Conservancy established a bison herd with 13 animals in 2009 from Wind Cave National Park. The population of 90 bison not only represent a vital component for the tallgrass prairie ecosystem, but also help preserve the genetic integrity in the conservation of American bison. Typically a third of the prairie grasslands is burned each year. The fire and grazing animals are used to prevent trees from taking over the prairie.

== See also ==
- List of protected grasslands of North America
- List of National Historic Landmarks in Kansas
