= Wolakota Buffalo Range =

Native American bison herd in South Dakota

Coordinates: 43°2′7.14″N 101°3′55.91″W

- Interactive map of Wolakota Buffalo Range
- Location: Rosebud Indian Reservation, South Dakota
- Area: 28,000 acres (110 km^{2})
- Established: October 30, 2020
- Operator: Rosebud Economic Development Corporation
- Website: www.sicangu.co/wolakota

The Wolakota Buffalo Range is a nearly 28,000-acre native grassland (11,000 ha) for a bison herd on the Rosebud Indian Reservation in South Dakota, home of the federally recognized Sicangu Oyate (the Upper Brulé Sioux Nation) – also known as Sicangu Lakota, and the Rosebud Sioux Tribe, a branch of the Lakota people. The Rosebud Economic Development Corporation (REDCO), the economic arm of the Rosebud Sioux Tribe, is managing the land. Established in 2020, the herd will help develop ecological restoration, cultural practices, economic development, food security and public education. Wolakota involves public and private partners coming together in support of native-led efforts. Bison is the correct taxonomic term but buffalo is the common vernacular term. Buffalo continues to hold a lot of cultural significance, particularly for Indigenous people and is commonly used.

On October 30, 2020, 100 wild bison from nearby national parks were released. This initial transfer included Theodore Roosevelt and Badlands National Parks each donating 50 bison. Sixty excess yearlings and two-year old bison from the Wind Cave bison herd were sent in October. The Wichita Mountains Wildlife Refuge donated some of their excess bison to the range in November in support of the 2020 Bison Conservation Initiative. The refuge is helping restore conservation herds when their herd grows beyond a comfortable carrying capacity. Excess bison from 2021 roundup at the Rocky Mountain Arsenal National Wildlife Refuge were donated where for the first time Indigenous peoples joined refuge staff for the roundup. Thirty-five bison were donated in February 2021 from American Prairie in Montana.

The conservation of bison is an ongoing, diverse effort to bring bison back from the brink of extinction. Public and private partners are supporting native-led efforts. The 2020 Bison Conservation Initiative by the Department of the Interior strengthened mechanisms for delivery of bison to Native American tribes and provided for the transfer of bison from the Interior's herds to Wolakota. The initiative that has five central goals: wild, healthy bison herds; genetic conservation; shared stewardship; ecological restoration; and cultural restoration. American Prairie partners with native tribes who are working to restore a deeper cultural, spiritual and economic connection to bison and have agreed to contribute up to 170 bison to the herd. The World Wildlife Fund is assisting with technical assistance, fundraising guidance, and connections to other organizations. In order increase the genetic health of the species, they committed to supporting the establishment of five herds of at least 1,000 individuals each in the Northern Great Plains. Toyota is working with the World Wildlife Fund by donating funds for fencing with a commitment to annual ecological monitoring to understand how buffalo restoration and management impacts land, soil, water, vegetation and biodiversity health. The range was previously overgrazed by cattle. With rotational grazing, the bison will be moved into different areas of the range to mimic the way they moved across the plains. The bison eat the plentiful yucca plants by tearing them up by the roots which allows the native grasses to return. Bison management is used to improve the health and habitat quality for other wildlife.

Cultural relevance includes designating a certain number of animals per year for ceremonial hunts including coming-of-age ceremonies and community harvests. The Lakota immersion school, Wakanyeja Tokeyahci (Children First) run by the nonprofit Sicangu Community Development Corporation, received a grant to purchase herd shares that provides meat for meals for the students.
