= Garden City National Forest =

National Forest in Kansas, United States

Coordinates: 37°56′40″N 101°53′25″W

Garden City National Forest was established as the Garden City Forest Reserve by the U.S. Forest Service in Kansas on July 25, 1905, with 97,280 acres (393.7 km^{2}). It became a National Forest on March 4, 1907. On May 15, 1908, it was expanded and renamed Kansas National Forest, and on December 1, 1915, it was abolished. As Kansas National Forest the lands encompassed Finney, Grant, Hamilton, Haskell and Kearny counties, with 302,387 acres (122,372 ha).

The project was intended as a research project to establish an inventory of suitable tree species for planting in the high plains climate. Plantings in 1906 with 50,000 yellow pines and 30,000 hackberry, locust and Osage orange trees, followed the next year with 170,000 additional trees including black locust, jack pine, Scotch pine and other evergreens. Prairie fires and drought killed most of the trees, and additional plantings were unsuccessful. The best performing trees never exceeded 24 inches (61 cm) in height during the experiment. The land was dispersed to homesteaders after disestablishment. A total of 800,000 seedlings were planted, only about 1,000 acres (400 ha) of the designated forest area.

A 3,760-acre (1,520 ha) remainder of the designated lands is maintained by the state of Kansas as the Sandsage Bison Range & Wildlife Area, formerly the Finney Game Refuge. A remnant of the tree planting program is visible in one of the reserve's pastures.
