= Prairie State Park =

State park in Missouri, United States

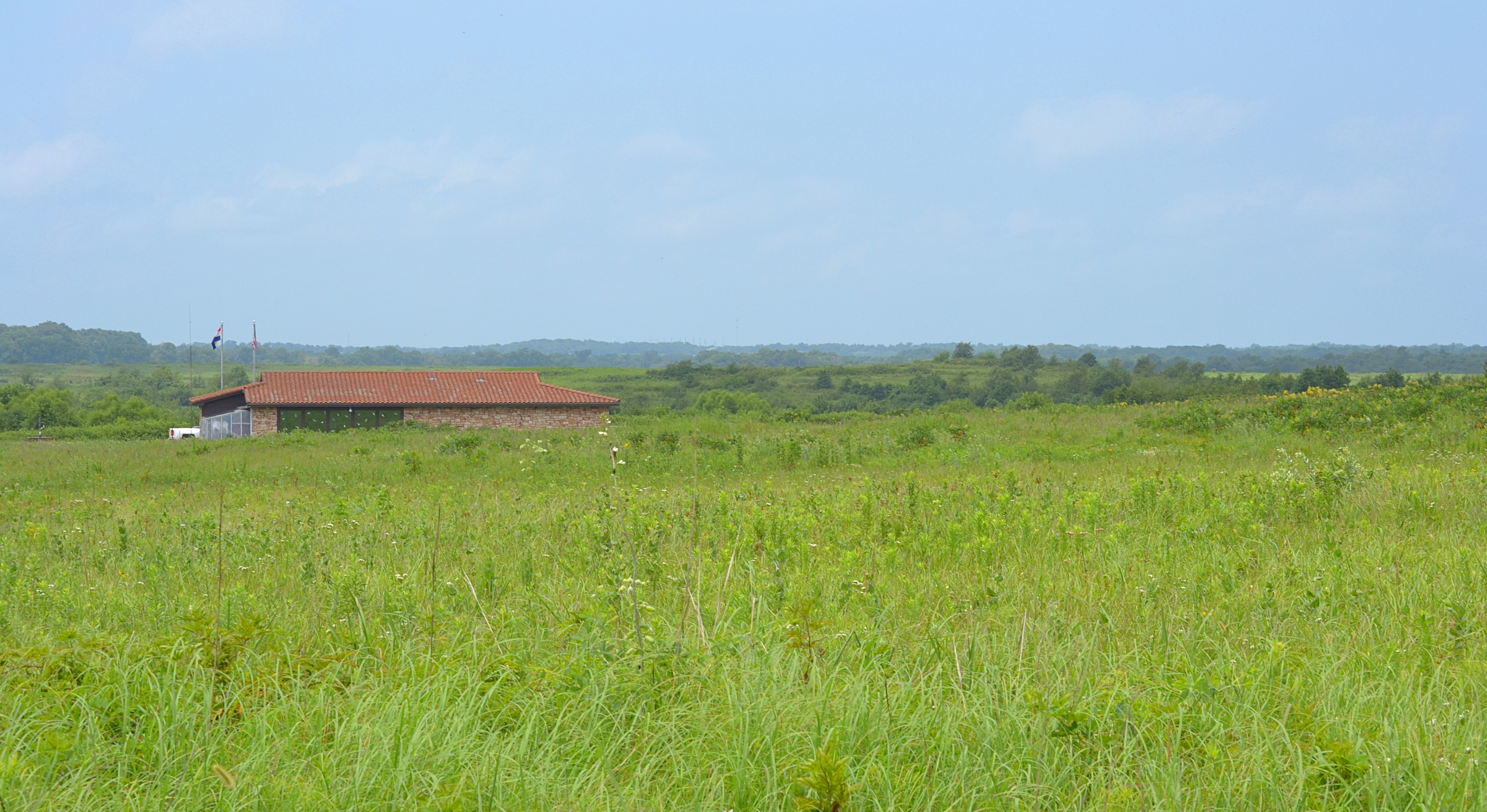
- Visitor center viewed from the prairie

- Location within Missouri Location within the United States
- Location: Barton County, Missouri, United States
- Coordinates: 37°30′44″N 94°34′18″W
- Area: 3,955.26 acres (1,600.64 ha)
- Established: 1980
- Administrator: Missouri Department of Natural Resources
- Visitors: 38,681 (in 2023)
- Website: Official website

Prairie State Park is a public recreation area encompassing nearly 4,000 acres (1,600 ha) of grasslands and woodlands in Barton County, Missouri. The state park preserves much of the few remaining acres of tallgrass prairie in the state. The park features hiking trails, camping for backpackers, and a nature center. Captive wild bison and elk roam the park. The bison herd contains about 100 individuals as of spring 2021.

== Ecology ==
Prairie State Park is in the central forest-grasslands transition ecoregion of the temperate grasslands, savannas and shrublands biome.
