= Konza Prairie Biological Station =

Protected area in the Flint Hills, Kansas, U.S.

Konza Prairie
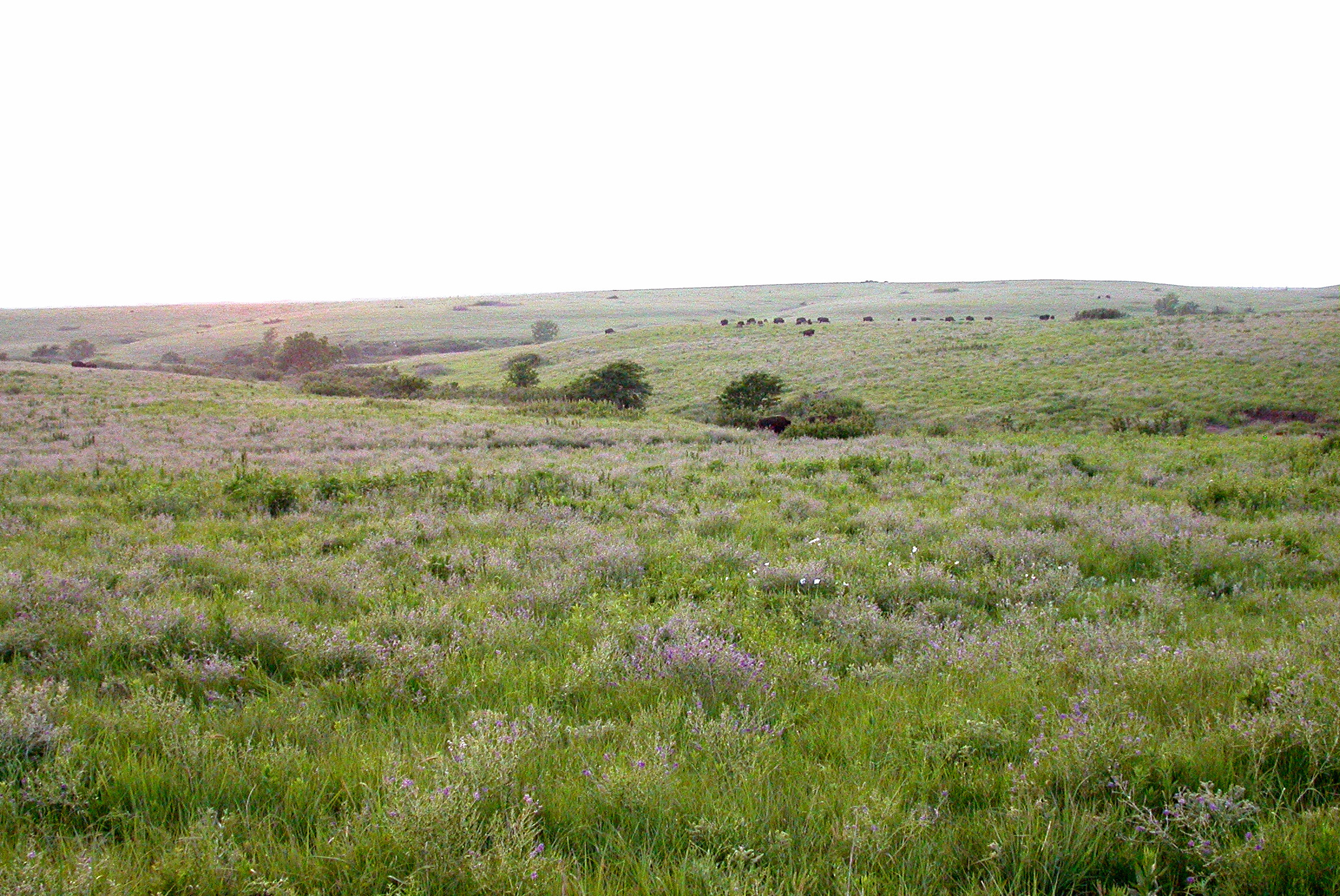
- Konza in spring with herd of bison in distance

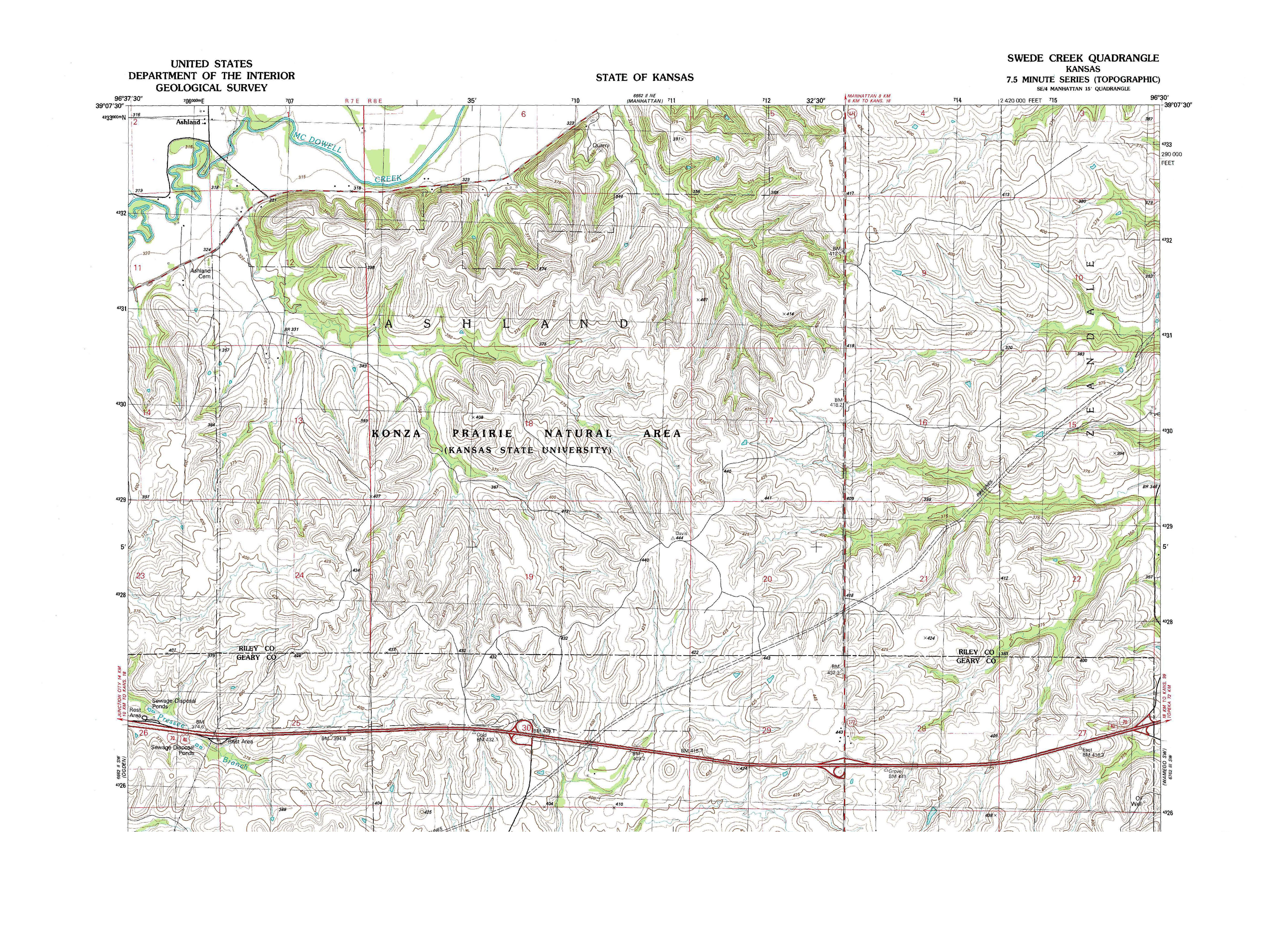
- USGS topographic map of Konza Prairie
- Location: Flint Hills, Riley and Geary Counties, Kansas, United States
- Nearest town: Manhattan, Kansas
- Coordinates: 39°05′35″N 96°33′31″W
- Area: 13.463 sq mi (34.87 km^{2})
- Elevation: 1,080 ft (330 m)
- Established: 1971
- Operator: The Nature Conservancy, Kansas State University
- Website: Konza Prairie Biological Station

The Konza Prairie Biological Station is a 8,616-acre (3,487 ha) protected area of native tallgrass prairie in the Flint Hills of northeastern Kansas. "Konza" is an alternative name for the Kansa or Kaw Indians who inhabited this area until the mid-19th century. The Konza Prairie is owned by The Nature Conservancy and Kansas State University.

== Geography ==
Konza Prairie is located within the largest remaining area of unplowed tallgrass prairie in North America, the Flint Hills. It is located approximately 10 kilometres (6.2 mi) south of Manhattan, Kansas and its southern boundary parallels Interstate 70. A scenic overlook exists on the preserve's eastern boundary along K-177.

The site is topographically complex with an elevation range from 1050 to 1457 ft (320 to 444 m). In addition to the dominant tallgrass prairie, Konza contains forest, claypan, shrub and riparian communities. Limestone outcrops are found throughout the landscape.

== Climate ==
It has a continental climate characterized by warm, wet summers and dry, cold winters. Average annual precipitation (32.9 in, 835 mm) is sufficient to support woodland or savanna vegetation; consequently, drought, fire and grazing are important in maintaining this grassland.

== Flora and fauna ==
The vegetation of Konza Prairie is dominated by native tallgrass which can reach over 2.5 metres in height in the most productive years. The prairie is dominated by plants adapted to the continental climate, mainly perennial grasses such as big bluestem (Andropogon gerardii), little bluestem (Andropogon scoparius), Indiangrass (Sorghastrum nutans), and switchgrass (Panicum virgatum). The grassland habitats include upland prairie on thin loess soils, hill prairie along alternating limestone benches and slopes, and areas of lowland prairie on deep alluvial-colluvial soils.

Konza supports a diverse mix of species including 576 vascular plants, 31 mammals, 208 bird species, 34 types of reptiles and amphibians, 20 kinds of fish, and over 700 types of invertebrates. Native white-tailed deer and wild turkey are often present in large numbers. A herd of approximately 200 bison graze on 2,400 acres (970 ha) of the hills of the Konza Prairie.

== Conservation ==
The site is operated as a field research station by the Kansas State University's Division of Biology. It is one of 26 sites within the Long Term Ecological Research Network. The site was established to provide a natural laboratory for the study of ecological patterns and processes in native tallgrass prairie ecosystems. Key natural processes that regulate and sustain the tallgrass prairie are periodic fire, ungulate grazing, and a variable continental climate. Thus, these processes are the focus of much of the long-term research. Other research by the Kansas State University includes physiological ecology, population and community ecology of plants, insects, birds and mammals, aquatic ecology, ecosystem and landscape ecology, and grasslands restoration ecology. In 2010, 2.8 miles (4.5 km) of stream channels were cleared of woody plant encroachment. Research has shown that reintroducing bison has long-term benefits as their presence makes the land more biodiverse and resilient to drought.

The biological station provides educational opportunities for students from elementary school to post-graduate level.

Members of the public are allowed onto portions of the Konza Prairie through three loop hiking trails (approximately 2.6, 4.5, and 6 miles).

The Konza prairie was designated a UNESCO biosphere reserve in 1978. It was one of 17 reserves in the United States withdrawn from the programme in June 2017 by request of the U.S. government.

The Konza in winter.

A Konza walking trail in the fall.

This bridge crosses Kings Creek.

== See also ==
- List of protected grasslands of North America
