= Nachusa Grasslands =

Restored prairie in Illinois

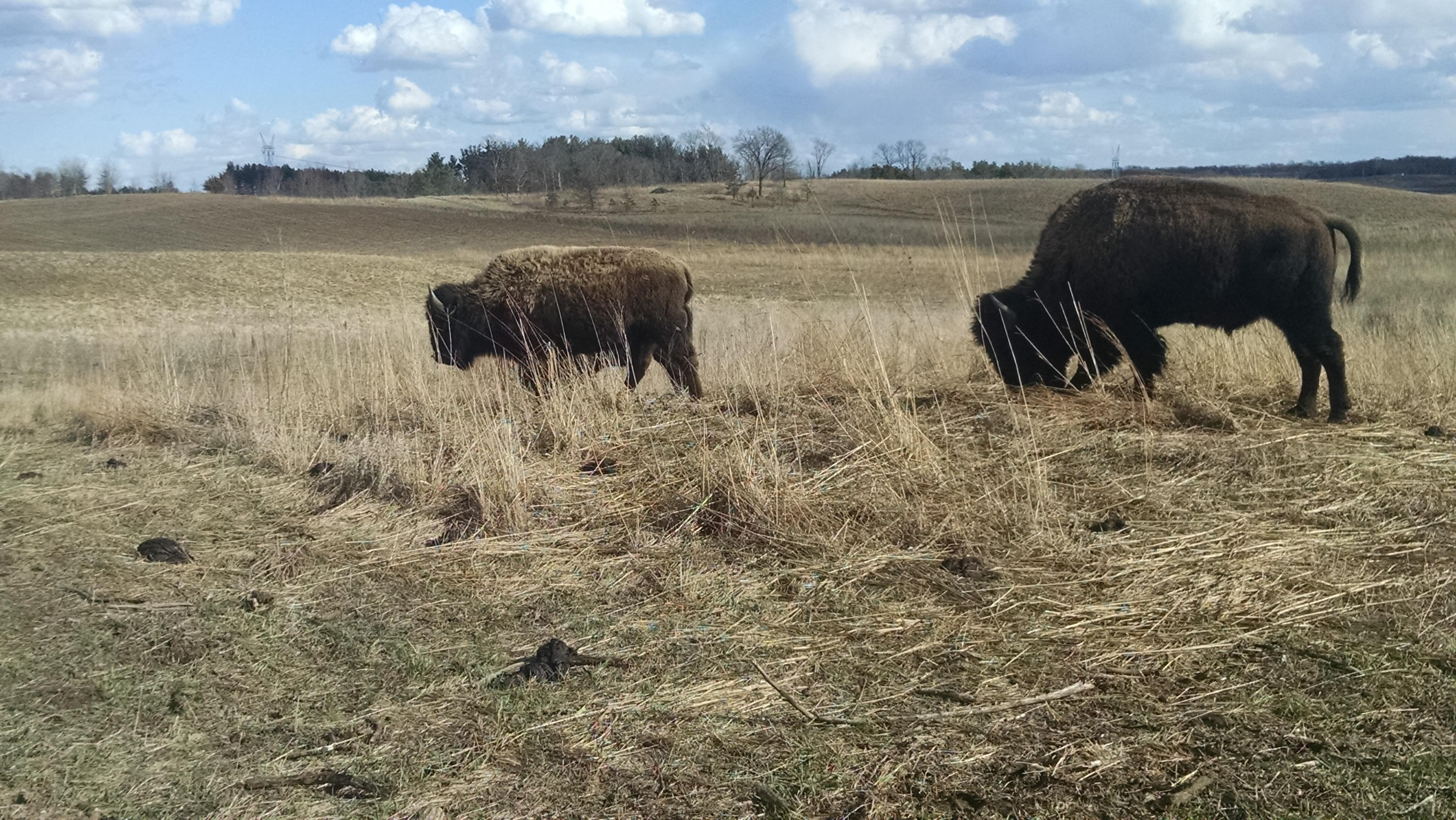
- Bison at Nachusa

- Location within Illinois Location within the United States
- Location: 2075 S Lowden Road; Franklin Grove, Illinois
- Coordinates: 41°53′28″N 89°20′37″W
- Area: 4,000 acres (1,600 ha)
- Established: 1986
- Governing body: The Nature Conservancy
- Website: Official website

The Nachusa Grasslands is a 3,800 acres (1,500 ha) restored tallgrass prairie near Franklin Grove in Lee County and Ogle County, Illinois. It is managed by The Nature Conservancy staff and volunteers.

== History ==
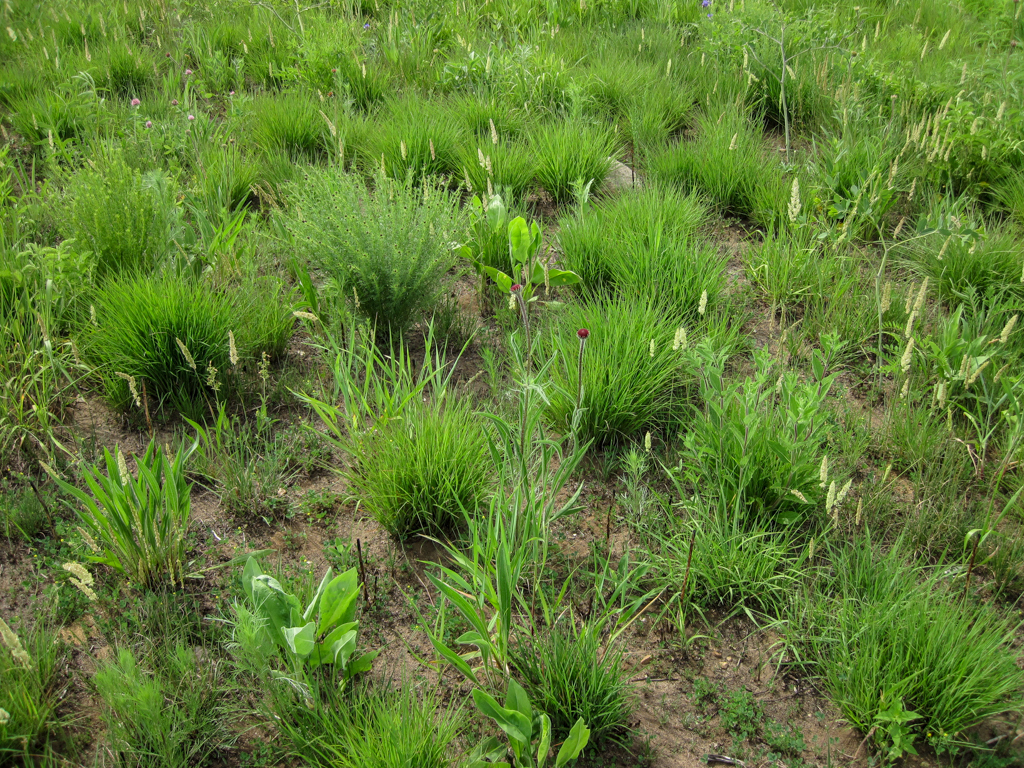
Prairie restoration in the spring

Most of northern Illinois was tallgrass prairie at the time of statehood in 1818. In the ensuing century, the vast majority of this prairie was plowed up for arable farmland. A Nature Conservancy planning process, aimed at building a restored tallgrass prairie ecosystem in Illinois, commenced in 1985; the first major land acquisition of 400 acres (160 ha) occurred in 1986. By 2022, the total current acreage had grown to over 4,100 acres (1,700 ha).

In February 2020, a fire destroyed the site's pole barn along with much of the equipment used to care for the preserve. The replacement plans include expansion to allow more space for convening volunteers, partners, scientists and community leaders.

== Bison reintroduction ==
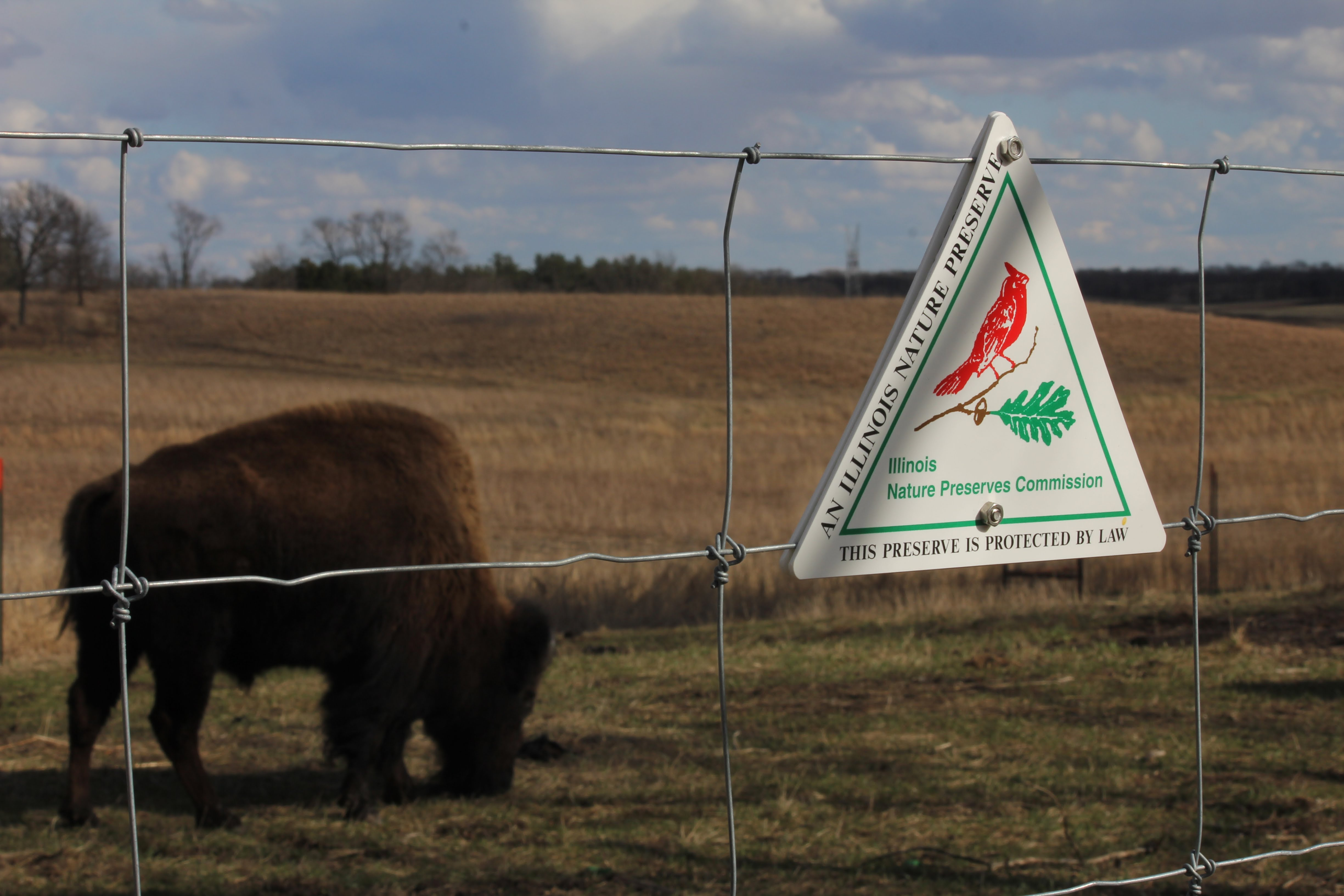
Bison in enclosure at Nachusa with Illinois Nature Preserves Commission sign

The Nachusa Grasslands planning process called for running up to 100 American bison (Bison bison, also commonly known as "buffalo") on approximately 1,500 acres (610 ha) of the preserve. Thirty bison from the Wind Cave bison herd were released in October 2014. This was the first conservation herd in Illinois. The bison were added to the approximately 700 species logged at the prairie. In April 2015, free-range bison calves were born, adding to hope that the Nachusa herd could be managed so as to be self-sustaining. As of July 2015, 14 calves have been born at Nachusa. By 2023, the summer herd size was 120-130 and the winter herd size was 90-100.

== Visitor center ==
The preserve's visitor center includes nearby trailheads, a pavilion with interpretive signage, self-composting restrooms, and a potable water supply. In 2021 it won an architecture award from the American Society of Landscape Architects. Attributes included fulfilling its mission without overpowering the surrounding landscape and that "the facility draws visitors into an interpretive rich shelter framing distant views telling the story of the vast prairie beyond"

== See also ==
- List of protected grasslands of North America
