= Cross Ranch State Park =

Park in North Dakota, USA

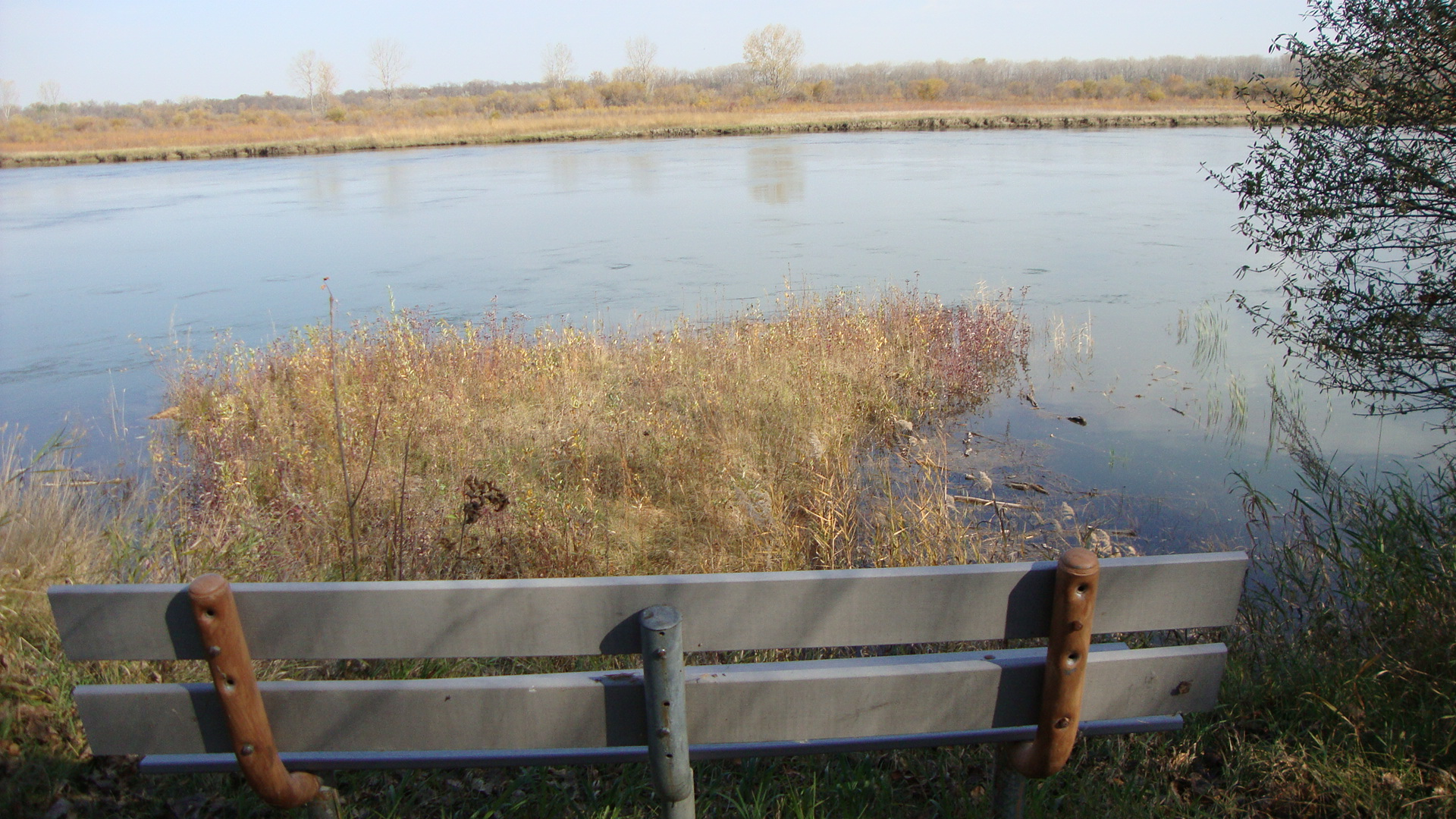
- Missouri River from Cross Ranch State Park

- Location within North Dakota
- Interactive map of Cross Ranch State Park
- Location: Oliver County, North Dakota, United States
- Nearest city: Washburn, North Dakota
- Coordinates: 47°12′26″N 101°00′17″W
- Area: 569.07 acres (230.29 ha)
- Elevation: 1,759 ft (536 m)
- Established: 1989
- Administrator: North Dakota Parks and Recreation Department
- Designation: North Dakota state park
- Website: Official website

Cross Ranch State Park is a public recreation area covering 569 acres (230 ha) on the west bank of the Missouri River nine miles (14 km) south of Washburn in Oliver County, North Dakota. The Nature Conservancy's Cross Ranch Nature Preserve, a 6,000-acre (2,400 ha) preserve which features a roaming herd of more than 200 adult bison, lies adjacent to the state park.

== History ==
In the late 1800s, A.G. Gaines, a scout and land agent for the Burlington Northern Railroad, owned an 11,000-acre ranch (4,500 ha) where the park and preserve now stand. Although the subsequent owners, Bob and Gladys Levis, wished for the land to become a state park, and its purchase was approved by the state legislature in 1979, Bismarck businessman Robert McCarney funded a statewide referral that killed the proposal. The Nature Conservancy purchased the ranch from the Levis in 1982. It then donated land for the state park in 1989, while holding onto 6,000 acres (2,400 ha) for use as a nature preserve.

== Activities and amenities ==
The state park and nature preserve provide 16 miles (26 km) of trails for hiking and cross-country skiing. The park also offers kayaking, canoeing, cabins, yurts, and campsites.
