= Maxwell Wildlife Refuge =

Wildlife refuge in McPherson County, Kansas

- Location within Kansas
- Location: McPherson County, Kansas
- Nearest city: McPherson, Kansas
- Coordinates: 38°28′38″N 97°27′02″W
- Area: 2,574 acres (1,042 ha)
- Governing body: Kansas Department of Wildlife and Parks
- Website: Official website

The Maxwell Wildlife Refuge in McPherson County, Kansas, consists of 2,574 acres (1,042 ha) of mostly mixed grass prairie. Bison and elk inhabit the refuge. The McPherson State Fishing Lake adjoins the refuge and adds another 260 acres (110 ha) of protected area, including a 46 acres (19 ha) lake.

== History ==
In 1859 an immigrant from Scotland, John Gault Maxwell (born 1825), settled in McPherson County. He helped to preserve the prairie and a remnant of the bison rapidly being extirpated from the Great Plains. In 1940, his son Henry willed $75,000 for the establishment of a refuge. In 1951, the Maxwell Wildlife Refuge was officially opened with a herd of 10 bison and 6 elk. A portion of the land was set aside for the construction of the McPherson County Fishing Lake.

== Description ==
The refuge sits at the southern edge of the Smoky Hills in the headwaters of Gypsum Creek at an elevation of about 1,500 feet (460 m). The land is rolling, with wooded areas in creek bottoms. Most of the vegetation is mixed grass prairie, intermediate between the tall grass prairie further east and the short grass prairie or steppe further west. Mixed grass prairie in Kansas is associated with areas receiving 20 inches (510 mm) to 30 inches (760 mm) annual precipitation.

== Wildlife and recreation ==
A herd of 150 bison and 75 elk roam the refuge. Up until 2020, there was an observation tower, but it has been removed. Tram rides through the refuge are conducted by the Friends of Maxwell. A road, often obstructed by bison herds, winds through the open range of the refuge.

A campground and public use area are located at McPherson State Fishing Lake. A .75 miles (1.21 km) long nature trail is near the southwest corner of the lake. Signs of the presence of beavers and sightings of white-tailed deer are common.
