= Mills, New Mexico =

- Unincorporated community
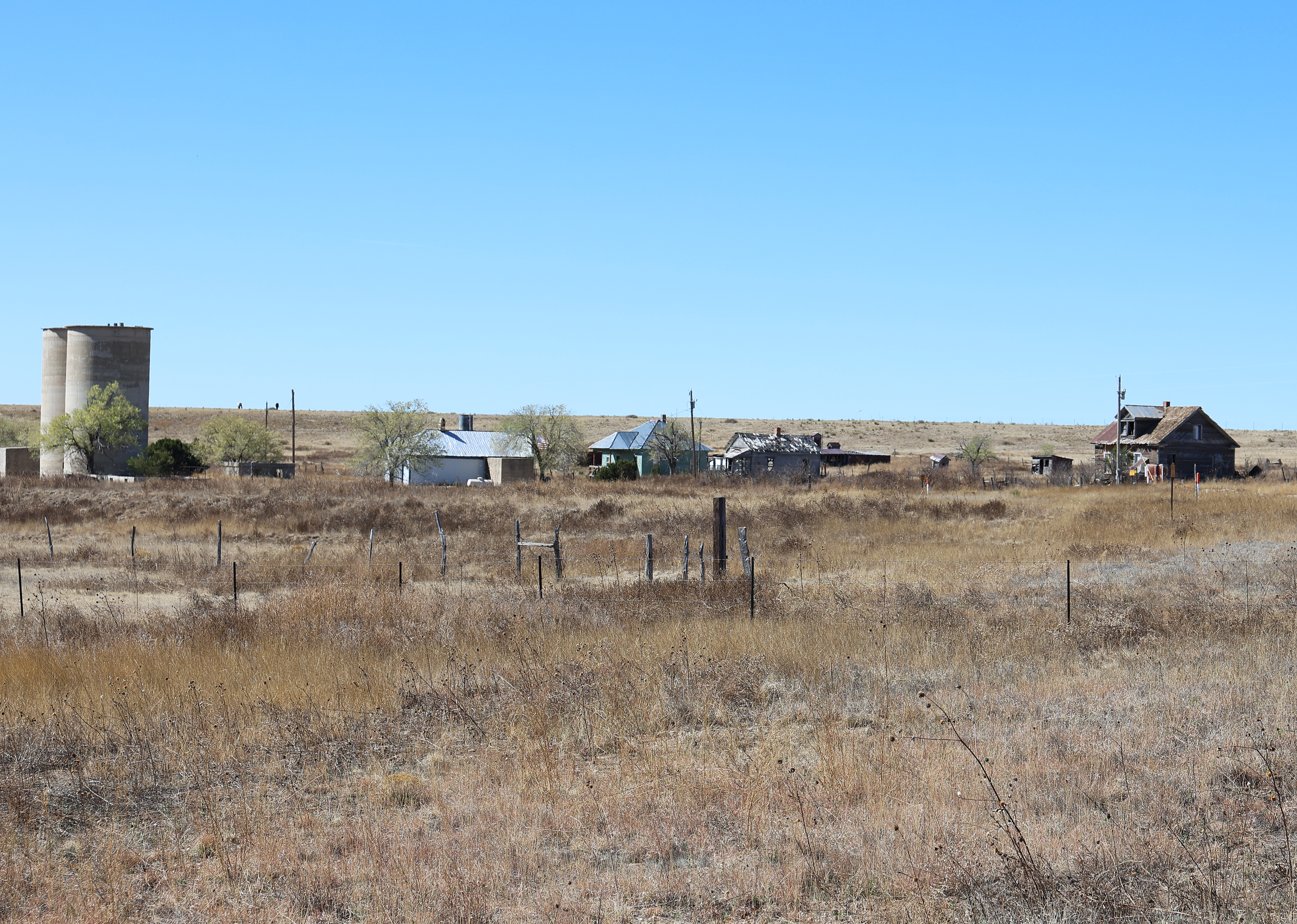
- Buildings in Mills in 2026

- Location within the state of New Mexico Mills (the United States)
- Coordinates: 36°05′08″N 104°15′19″W
- Country: United States
- State: New Mexico
- County: Harding
- Elevation: 6,115 ft (1,864 m)
- Time zone: UTC-7 (Mountain (MST))
  - Summer (DST): UTC-6 (MDT)
- ZIP codes: 87730
- Area code: 575
- GNIS feature ID: 908762

Mills is an unincorporated community in Harding County, New Mexico, United States, founded in 1888. It lies on NM 39, eleven miles north of Roy. Mills lies within the Kiowa National Grassland.

== History ==
Mills was named after Melvin W. Mills, a rancher and attorney.

The post office there opened in 1889, was closed from 1901 to 1908, and has been open since.
