= Grey Beard =

Southern Cheyenne Chief

Southern Cheyenne leader

Personal details
- Died: 1875 Baldwin, Florida
- Cause of death: Shot and killed trying to escape

Grey Beard (died 1875) was a Southern Cheyenne medicine man and chief. Among the Native American leaders and civilians rounded up at the end of the Red River War to be transported as a prisoner of war to Fort Marion in Florida, he is one of two who died during the incarceration.

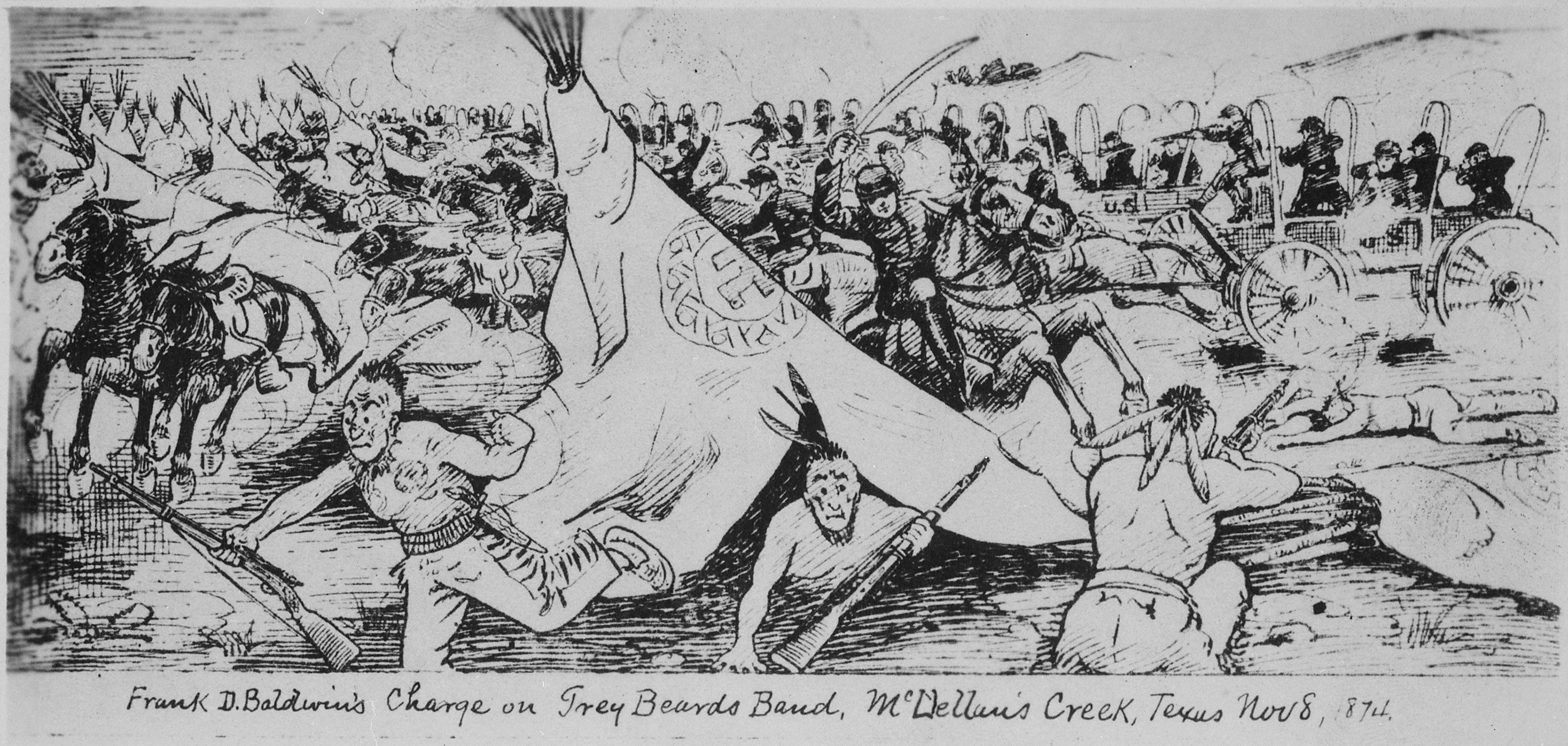
Frank Baldwin's charge on Grey Beard's Band, McClellan's Creek, TX, Nov. 8, 1874

He was a leader of a Hotamitaneo ("Dog soldier") society of young warriors. He was involved in a skirmish with Edwin Vose Sumner's troops at the Kansas River in 1857, and gained recognition among whites in 1867 for battling soldiers under Winfield Scott Hancock and George Armstrong Custer in an attempt to prevent the building of the Kansas Pacific Railroad across tribal lands. He refused to sign the failed Medicine Lodge Treaty, and continued fighting until 1871, when his people settled on a reservation in Indian Territory. In what is known as the Red River War, he and other chiefs began raiding settlements again in 1874 out of frustration with poaching of buffaloes. After participating in the Second Battle of Adobe Walls, Grey Beard and his followers went into hiding in what is now the Oklahoma Panhandle.

In late 1874, Grey Beard's band, numbering approximately 500 warriors and family, received two daughters who had been abducted from a family of settlers by Chief Medicine Water, husband of Mochi, on their way to Colorado. The girls were freed after a military surprise attack on his camp on November 8, 1874, near present-day McClellan Creek National Grassland, after which his band scattered across the plains and was pursued for two days across 96 miles by 120 soldiers from the United States Cavalry before escaping. Facing starvation, he surrendered to the Darlington Agency within a few months.

Because he was one of the ringleaders of the insurrection, Grey Beard was chosen to be among the Native Americans to be taken to Fort Marion, the old Spanish fort near Saint Augustine, Florida. Convinced that he and fellow prisoners were going to be killed by the Americans, he asked his captor, Captain Richard Henry Pratt, to write a letter conveying to his people that they should settle peacefully and cooperate with the United States government. He unsuccessfully attempted suicide by hanging himself during the train convoy. Later, he was shot and killed trying to escape. His body was left in Baldwin, Florida where he was later interred.
