= Kiowa National Grassland =

Protected area in northeast New Mexico

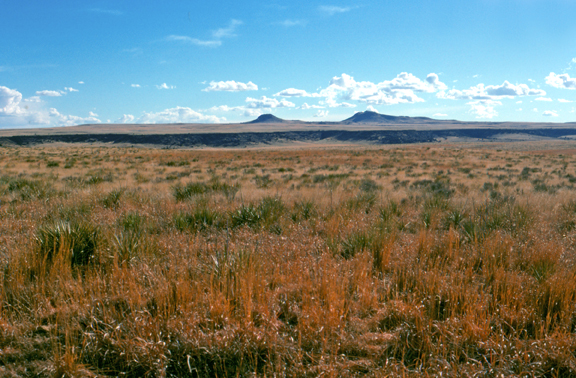
- Kiowa National Grassland with Rabbit Ear Mountains in the background.

- Location within the United States
- Location: Northeastern New Mexico, USA
- Nearest city: Clayton, NM
- Coordinates: 36°10′01″N 104°10′01″W
- Area: 137,131 acres (554.95 km^{2})
- Established: 1960
- Governing body: U.S. Forest Service
- Website: Kiowa and Rita Blanca National Grasslands

Kiowa National Grassland is a National Grassland, located in northeastern New Mexico. The southwestern Great Plains grassland includes prairie and part of the Canadian River Canyon.

== Sections ==
It is located in two non-adjacent units of northeastern New Mexico. The western unit is located in northwestern Harding, eastern Mora, and southeastern Colfax counties. The smaller eastern unit is located in eastern Union County, on the border with Oklahoma and Texas. The grassland has a total area of 137,131 acres (55,495 ha).

The grassland is administered by the U.S. Forest Service together with the Cibola National Forest and the Black Kettle, McClellan Creek, and Rita Blanca National Grasslands, from common headquarters located in Albuquerque, New Mexico. There are local ranger district offices located in Clayton.

=== Communities ===
The community of Mills lies within the western unit of the Kiowa National Grassland. Clayton is the nearest town to the eastern unit of the Grassland.

== Description ==
Both units of the National Grassland consist of a patchwork quilt of public land interspaced with private land. Elevations on the Grassland range from 4,500 to 6,300 feet (1,400 to 1,900 m) which is high enough to moderate somewhat the summer temperatures of the Great Plains. The average high and low temperatures for Clayton in July are 87 °F (31 °C) and 60 °F (16 °C) and January highs and lows are 47 °F (8 °C) and 20 °F (−7 °C). Annual precipitation is about 15 inches (380 mm) throughout the Grassland with July and August the wettest months and January and February the driest.

Semi-arid steppe grassland (shortgrass prairie) is the most common vegetation, covering 79 percent of the Grassland (including the adjacent Rita Blanca National Grassland). Ten percent of the land is covered with Pinyon – Juniper woodland, almost entirely in the western sector. A few stands of Ponderosa Pine are found in the Canadian River Canyon in the western sector. Nine percent of vegetative cover is Sand Sagebrush and one percent is Cottonwood and Willow riparian forest. The Canadian River is the only permanent stream. Playa lakes (shallow lakes which hold rainwater part of the year) are commonly found.

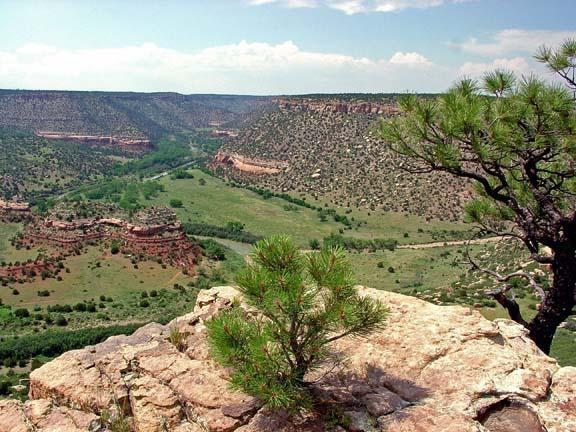
The Canadian River Canyon near Mills, New Mexico has been proposed as a Wilderness Area.

Nearly all of the land in the Kiowa National Grassland is leased to ranchers for grazing cattle which is the main economic activity in the region.

== Recreation ==
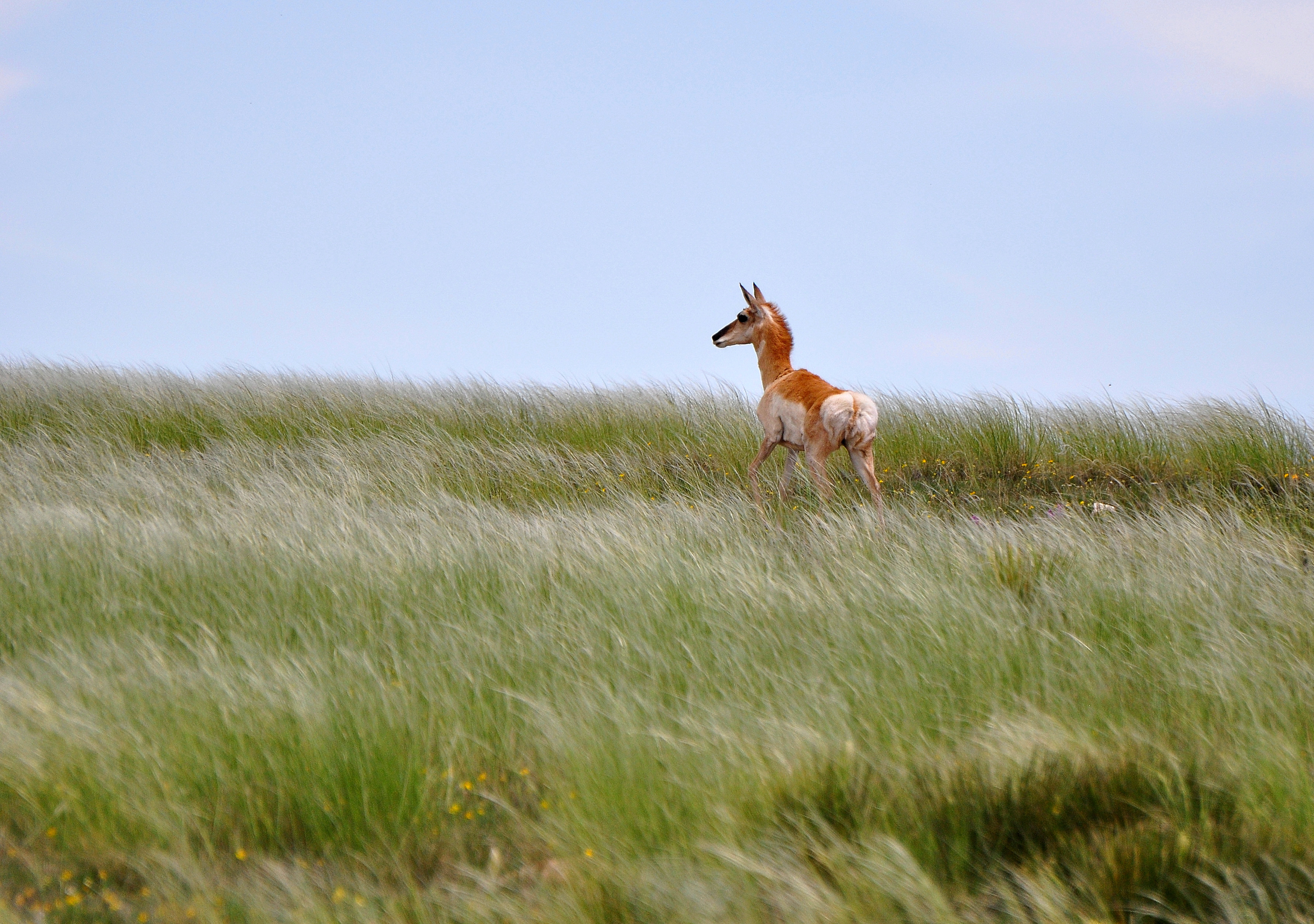
Pronghorn Antelope, Kiowa National Grasslands

=== Eastern Unit ===
Twenty-two miles (35 km) northeast of Clayton is McNees Crossing, a reliable source of water on the Santa Fe Trail. In 1828, two young traders, Robert McNees and Daniel Munro, were killed here by Native Americans. In 1831, the first celebration in New Mexico on Independence Day took place at McNees Crossing. Although on private property, a short trail leads to the crossing of Corrumpa Creek and an historical marker. Seventeen miles (27 km) north of Clayton is a three-mile (4.8 km) section of the Santa Fe Trail which is open for walking and horseback riding. The trail is marked by rock posts. The ruts of wagons that passed this way in the nineteenth century are still present.

=== Western Unit ===
The rim of the Canadian River Canyon, also called Mills Canyon, is six miles (9.7 km) west of the nearly-deserted community of Mills. About 15 mi (24 km) of the red-rock, well-vegetated canyon are in the National Grassland. The canyon is 700 feet (210 m) deep and more than 1 mi (1.6 km) wide from rim to rim. A primitive campground is on the rim. A road down into the canyon is traversable by foot, horseback, or high-clearance vehicles. On the canyon floor are the ruins of the homestead of Melvin Mills who had an apple orchard and a home here in the early 1900s. The area is rich in wildlife including introduced Barbary Sheep which flourish among the cliffs. The Canadian River has a variety of sport fishes including Largemouth Bass and Channel Catfish.

A wilderness area encompassing 6,032 acres (2,441 ha) was proposed in 2008 for the Cimarron River Canyon. The proposal would preserve the pristine state of about eight miles of the canyon. Fishing, hunting, and non-motorized travel would be permitted in the wilderness area.

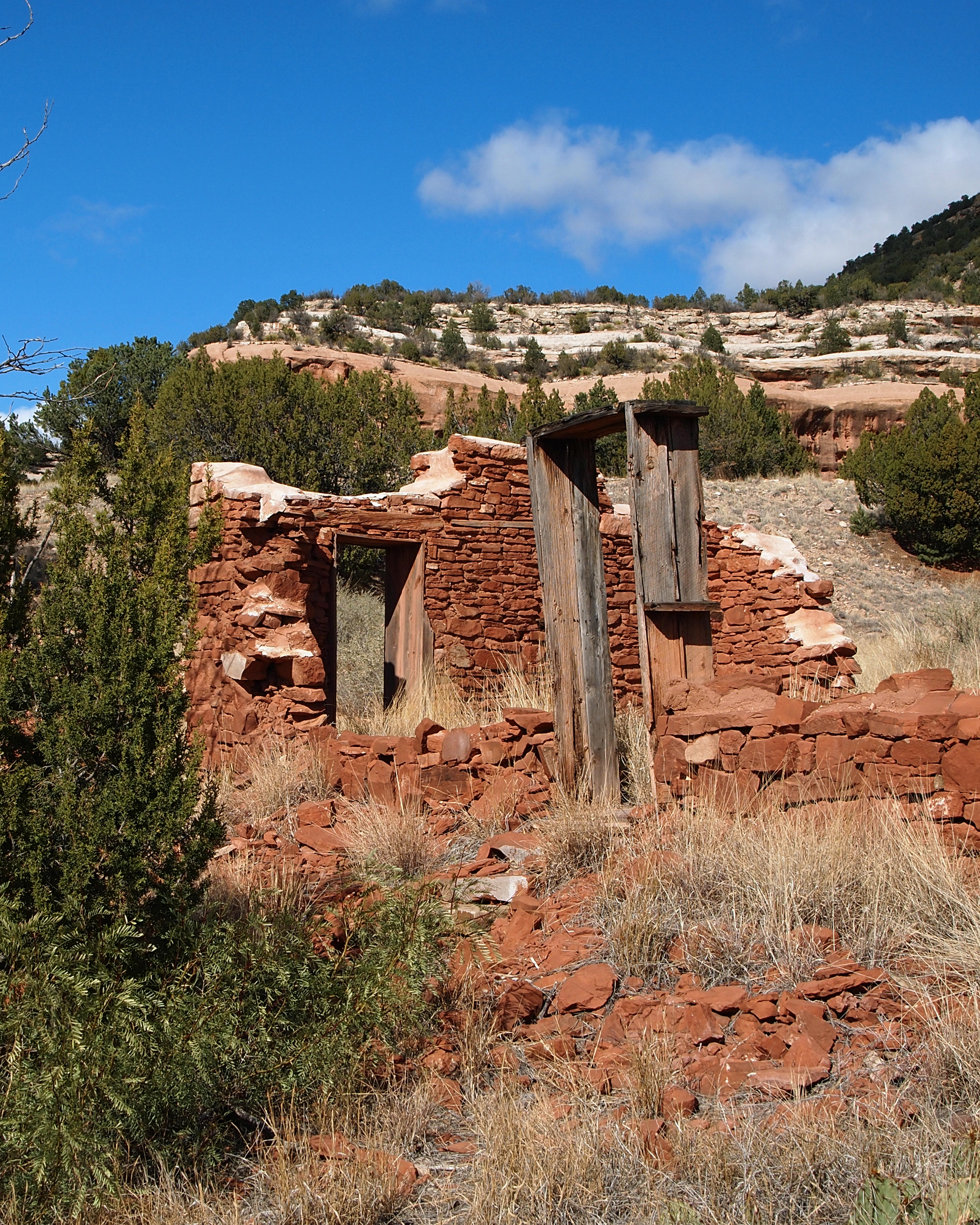
Ruins in Mill's Canyon, Kiowa Natl. Grassland

== See also ==
- List of protected grasslands of North America
- Grasslands of the Great Plains (U.S.)
- Native grasses of the Great Plains region
