= McClellan Creek National Grassland =

Protected area in Gray County, Texas

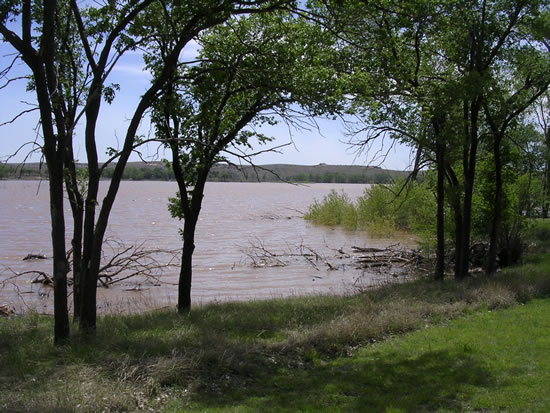
- Lake McClellan

- Location within Texas
- Location: Gray County, Texas, United States
- Nearest city: Alanreed, TX
- Coordinates: 35°12′39″N 100°52′08″W
- Area: 1,449 acres (5.86 km^{2})
- Governing body: U.S. Forest Service
- Website: Black Kettle and McClellan Creek National Grasslands

McClellan Creek National Grassland is a National Grassland located in southern Gray County, Texas, United States. It was purchased with the goal of restoring badly eroded land to its natural state. The grassland is administered by the U.S. Forest Service together with Cibola National Forest and Black Kettle, Kiowa, and Rita Blanca National Grasslands, from common headquarters located in Albuquerque, New Mexico. The grassland is part of the combined Black Kettle and McClellan Creek Ranger District with offices in Cheyenne, Oklahoma.

In February 2006, all of McClellan Creek National Grassland was burnt out in the 750,000-acre (300,000 ha) Interstate 40 fire. The majority of the trees were lost. The grassland's area is only 1,449 acres (586 ha). The grasslands surrounds McClellan Lake, a reservoir on the namesake McClellan Creek.

== Gallery ==
Map of states and counties affected by the Dust Bowl between 1935 and 1938 originally prepared by the Soil Conservation Service. The most severely affected counties are colored .

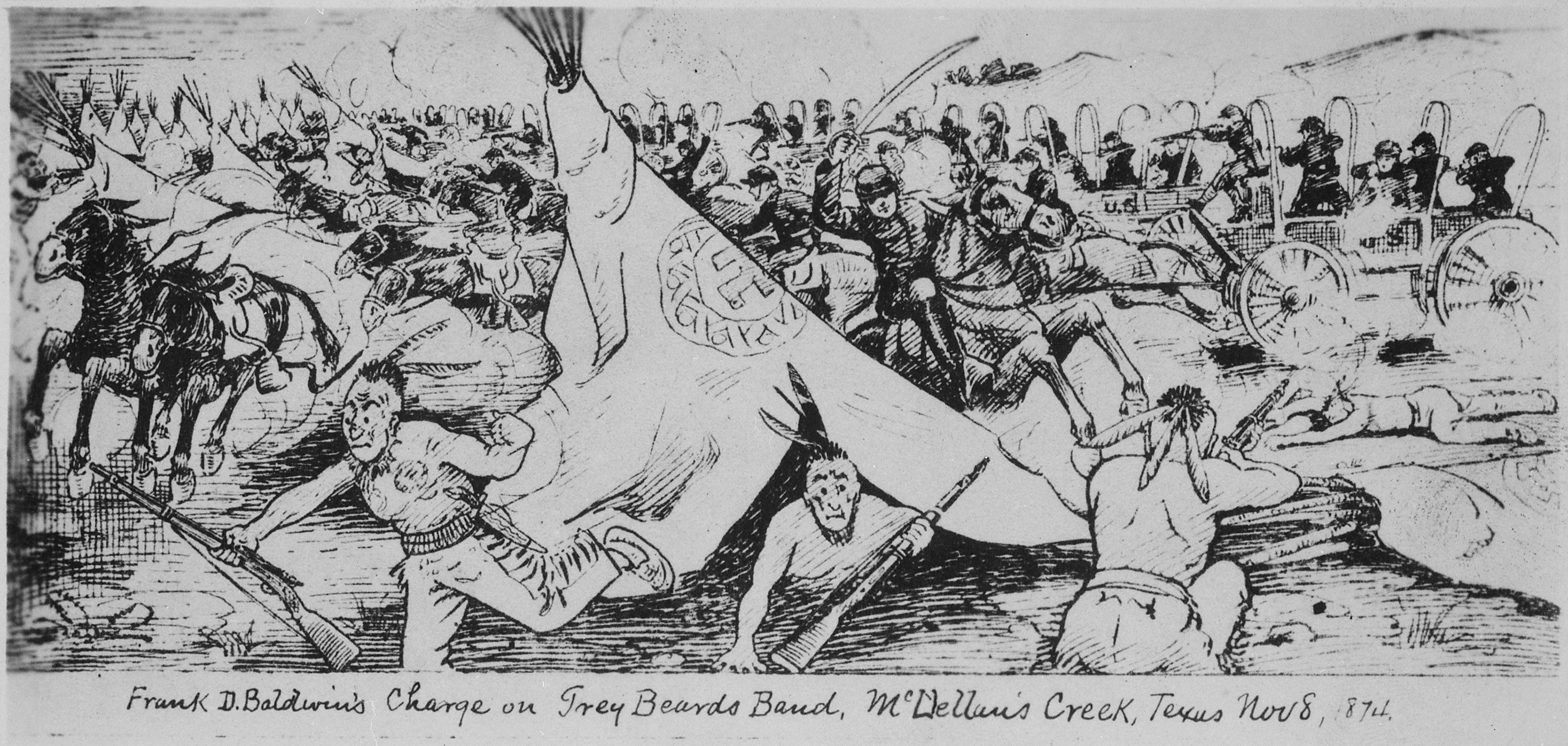
Frank Baldwin's charge on Grey Beard's Band, McClellan's Creek, TX, Nov. 8, 1874

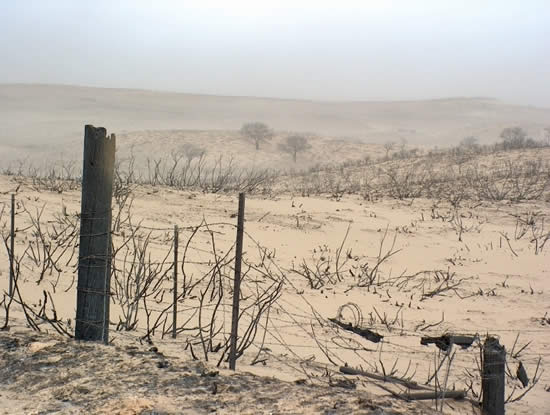
McClellan Creek National Grassland after the 2006 fire

== See also ==
- List of protected grasslands of North America
