= Rita Blanca National Grassland =

Protected grassland in Texas and Oklahoma

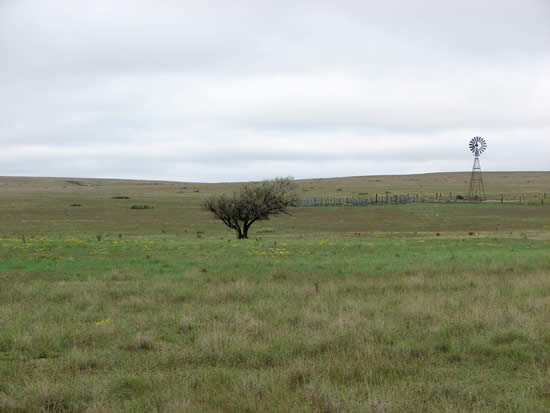

- Location within Oklahoma Location within Texas Location within the United States
- Location: Dallam County, Texas and Cimarron County, Oklahoma, United States
- Nearest city: Dalhart, Texas
- Coordinates: 36°26′02″N 102°36′00″W
- Area: 92,989 acres (376.31 km^{2})
- Governing body: U.S. Forest Service
- Website: Kiowa and Rita Blanca National Grasslands

Rita Blanca National Grassland is a National Grassland on the Great Plains near the community of Texline in northwest Dallam County, Texas, in the Texas Panhandle, and in southern Cimarron County, Oklahoma, in the western Oklahoma Panhandle. The principal city in the area is Dalhart, Texas, which houses the XIT Museum.

The name Rita Blanca (Little White River) was applied to a stream by Spanish sheepherders in the 19th century. It was later used by the XIT ranch and has been applied to other geographic features in the vicinity.

== History ==
Both Rita Blanca National Grassland and Kiowa National Grassland (KNG), farther west in New Mexico, are the result of the Dust Bowl of the 1930s. The Dust Bowl experience had shown the U.S. Government that climatic challenges made total conversion of the Great Plains to agriculture not only infeasible but undesirable. The National Industrial Act and Emergency Relief Appropriations Act, which passed Congress in 1933 and 1935, gave the federal government authority to buy failed cropland, and the Bankhead–Jones Farm Tenant Act of 1937 gave authority to transfer about 3,850,000 acres (15,600 km^{2}) to the Soil Conservation Service to restore the eroded soil and to protect the grasslands. In 1960, Congress approved the creation of KNG and RBNG.

== General description ==
The elevation of Rita Blanca National Grassland ranges from a high of 4,700 feet (1,400 m) in northwestern Cimarron County, Oklahoma, to a low of 3,700 feet (1,100 m) in southeastern Dallam County, Texas. It is not a solid block of protected land, but rather several small blocks of U.S. Forest Service–owned native prairie grasslands, interspersed with privately owned property. The area is classed as semi-arid, and serves as habitat for pronghorn, rabbits, prairie dogs, coyotes and predatory birds.. Vegetation is primarily shortgrass. It has a land area of 92,989 acres (376.31 km^{2}). The greater part, 77,463 acres (313.48 km^{2}) is in Texas, and the balance 15,860 acres (64.2 km^{2}) is in Oklahoma.

Rita Blanca National Grassland is administered by Cibola National Forest, along with the Great Plains Black Kettle National Grassland, Kiowa National Grassland, and McClellan Creek National Grassland, and forest ranger districts in New Mexico. The Cibola National Forest headquarters are located in Albuquerque, New Mexico. There are local ranger district offices located in Clayton, New Mexico.

== Ecology ==
A team led by Donald L. Hazlett studied the history and ecology of the Kiowa and Rita Blanca Natural Grasslands, and reported its findings to the U.S. Department of Agriculture, Forest Service in 2009. The RBNG has a very complex natural ecosystem, with a wide variety of flora and fauna. They found, for example, 826 different species of vascular plants, representing 81 different families.

== Gallery ==
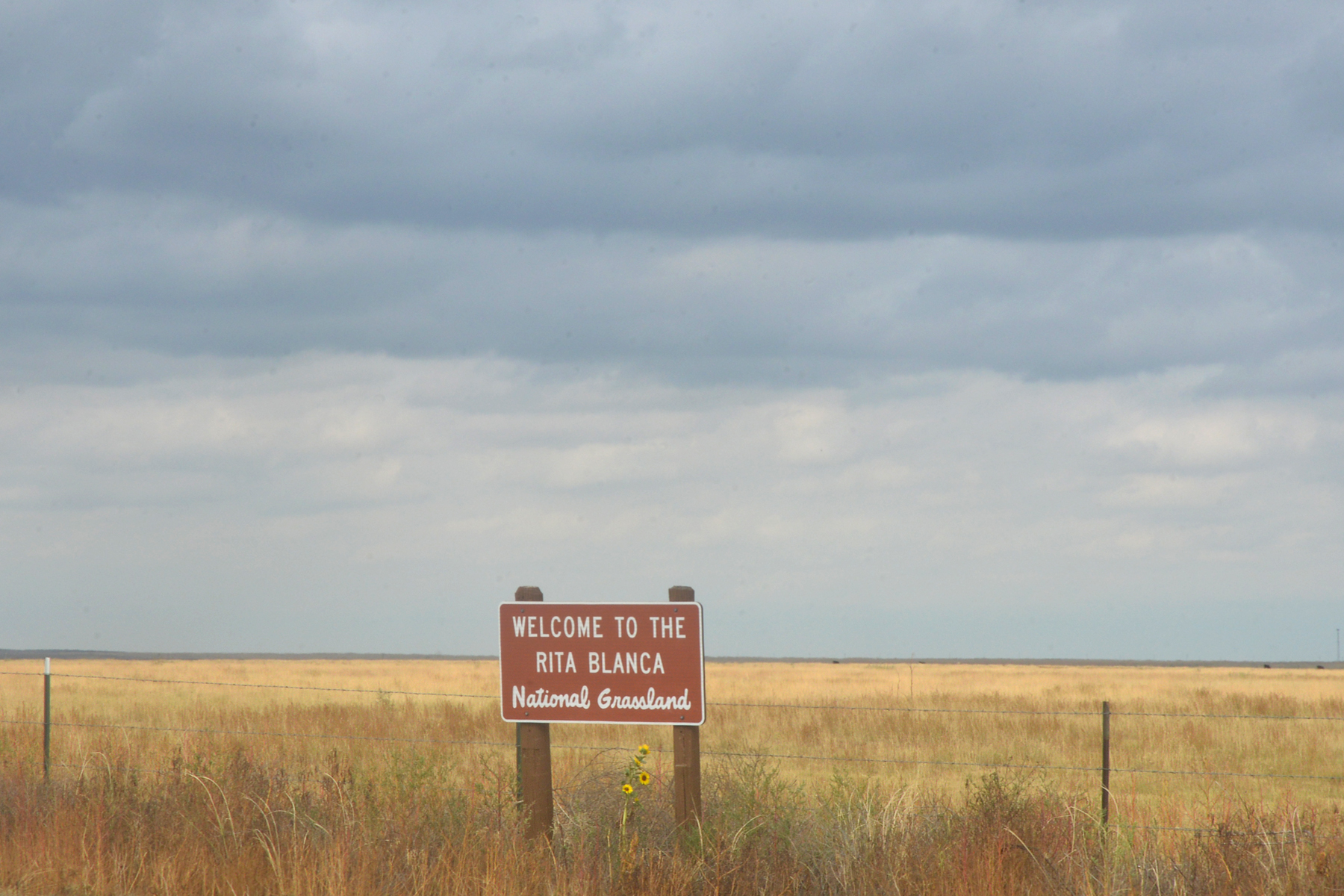
A welcome sign at Rita Blanca National Grassland, Dallam County, Texas.

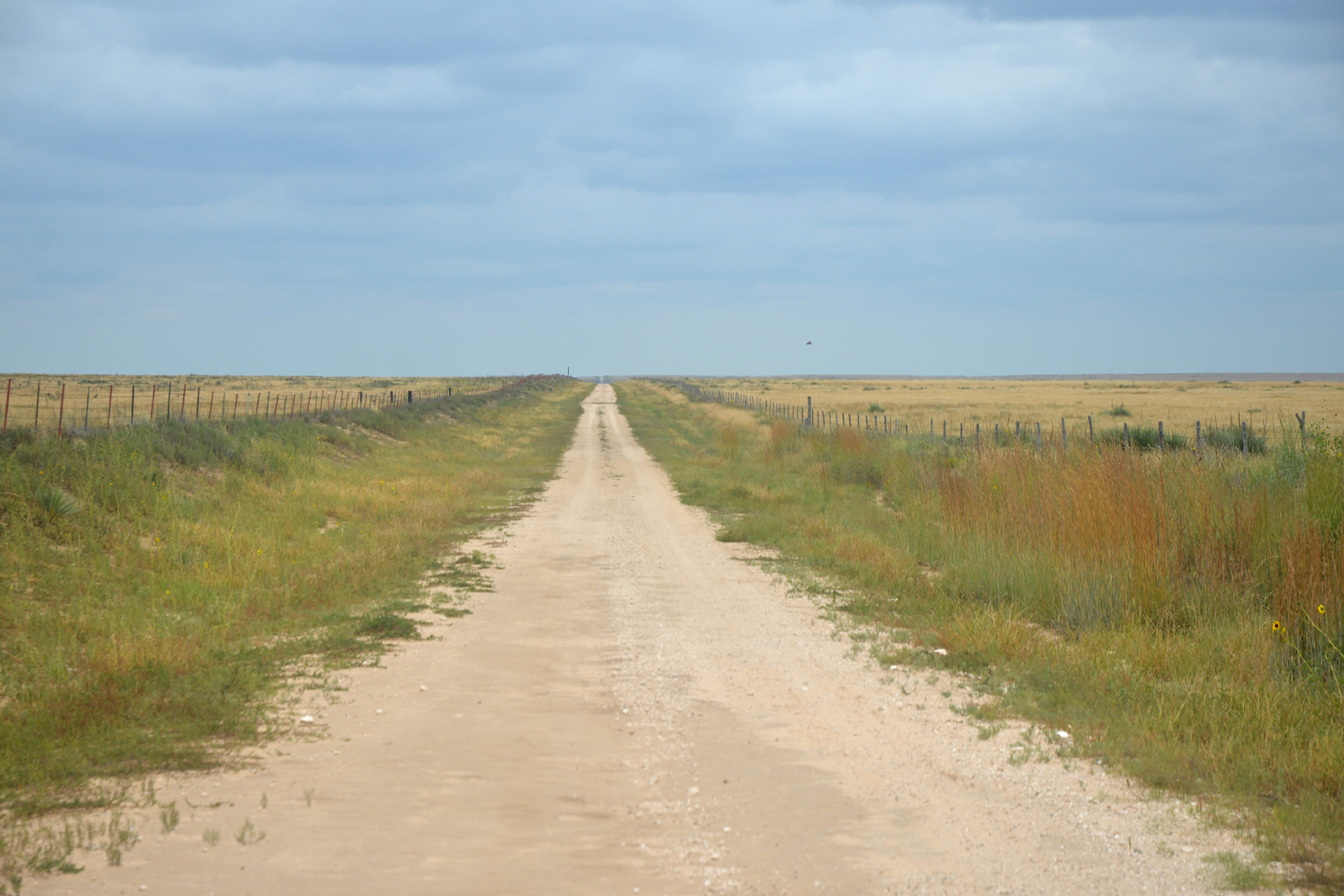
West High Lonesome Lane in Rita Blanca National Grassland, Dallam County, Texas.

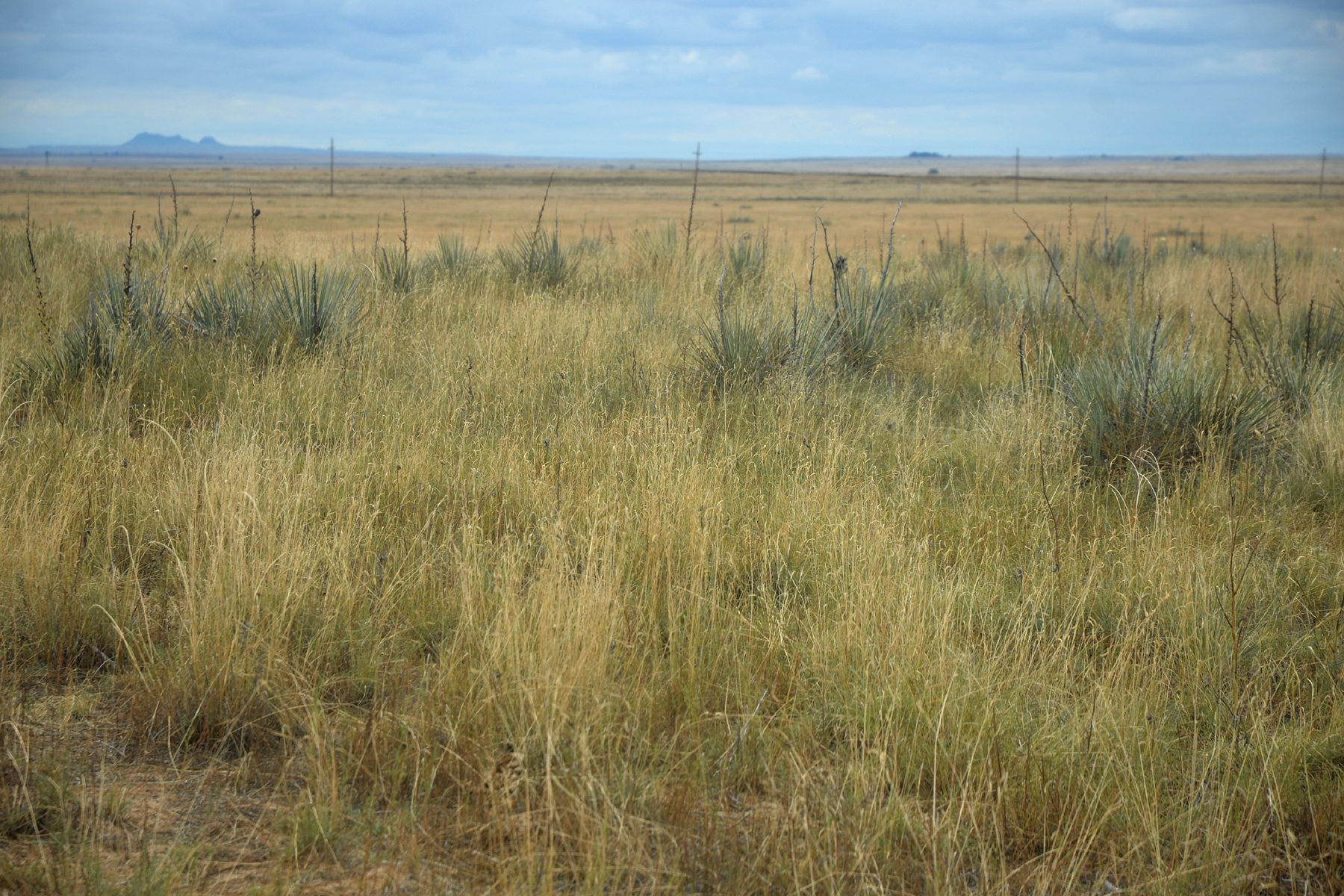
Rita Blanca National Grassland as seen from West High Lonesome Lane, Dallam County, Texas.

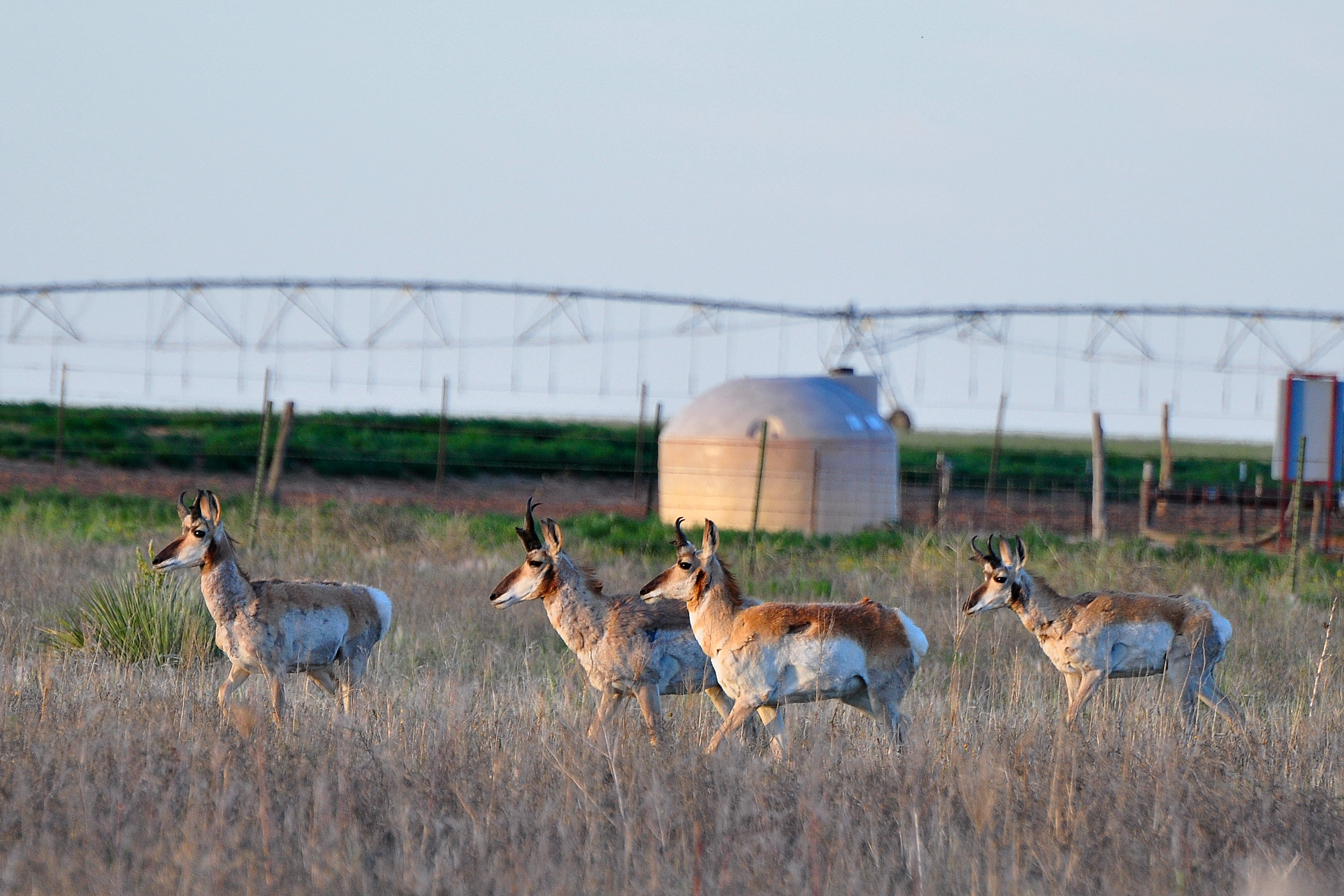
Pronghorn (Antilocapra americana) on Rita Blanca National Grassland, Texas

Map of states and counties affected by the Dust Bowl between 1935 and 1938 originally prepared by the Soil Conservation Service. The most severely affected counties are colored .

== See also ==
- List of protected grasslands of North America
- Grasslands of the Great Plains (U.S.)
- Native grasses of the Great Plains region
