= Frank Baldwin =

US Army general and Medal of Honor recipient

Frank Dwight Baldwin
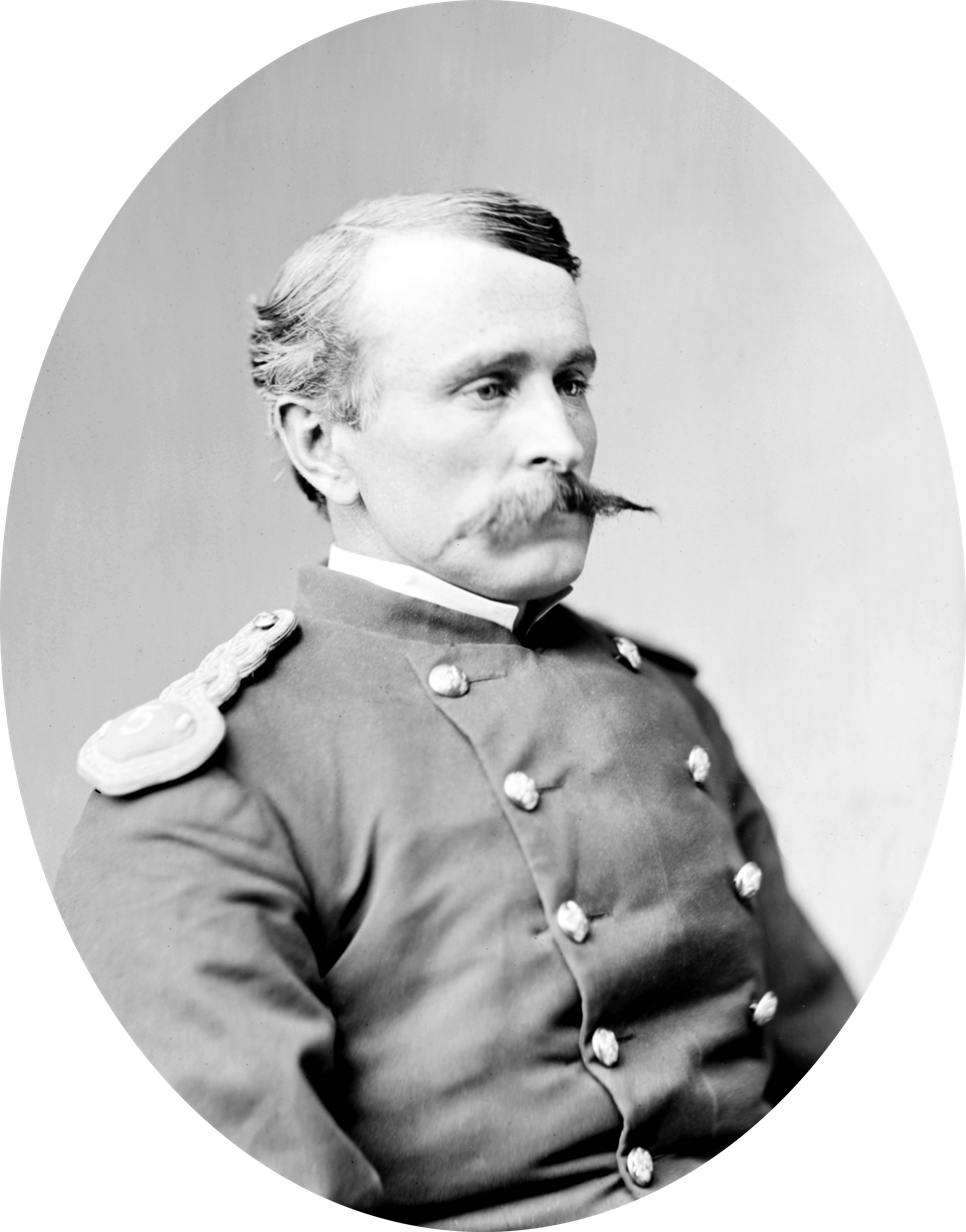
- Frank D. Baldwin
- Born: June 26, 1842; Manchester, Michigan, US
- Died: April 22, 1923 (aged 80); Denver, Colorado, US
- Burial place: Arlington National Cemetery
- Military career
- Allegiance: United States of America; Union
- Branch: United States Army; Union Army
- Service years: 1861–1906
- Rank: Major General
- Units: 19th Regiment Michigan Volunteer Infantry; 19th U.S. Infantry Regiment; 5th U.S. Infantry Regiment; 4th U.S. Infantry Regiment
- Commands: 27th U.S. Infantry Regiment
- Conflicts: American Civil War; Indian Wars; Spanish–American War
- Awards: Medal of Honor (2)

Frank Dwight Baldwin (June 26, 1842 – April 22, 1923), a resident of Constantine, Michigan, and born in Manchester, Michigan, is one of only 19 servicemen to receive the Medal of Honor twice. Baldwin received his first award for his actions during the Atlanta Campaign where he led his company in battle at Peachtree Creek and captured two commissioned officers in the American Civil War. He received his second for conspicuous bravery in 1874 during the Indian Wars. Baldwin holds the distinction of being a recipient of the Medal of Honor in different conflicts. He also fought in the Philippines during the Spanish–American War and rose to the rank of major general before retiring.

== Life and career ==
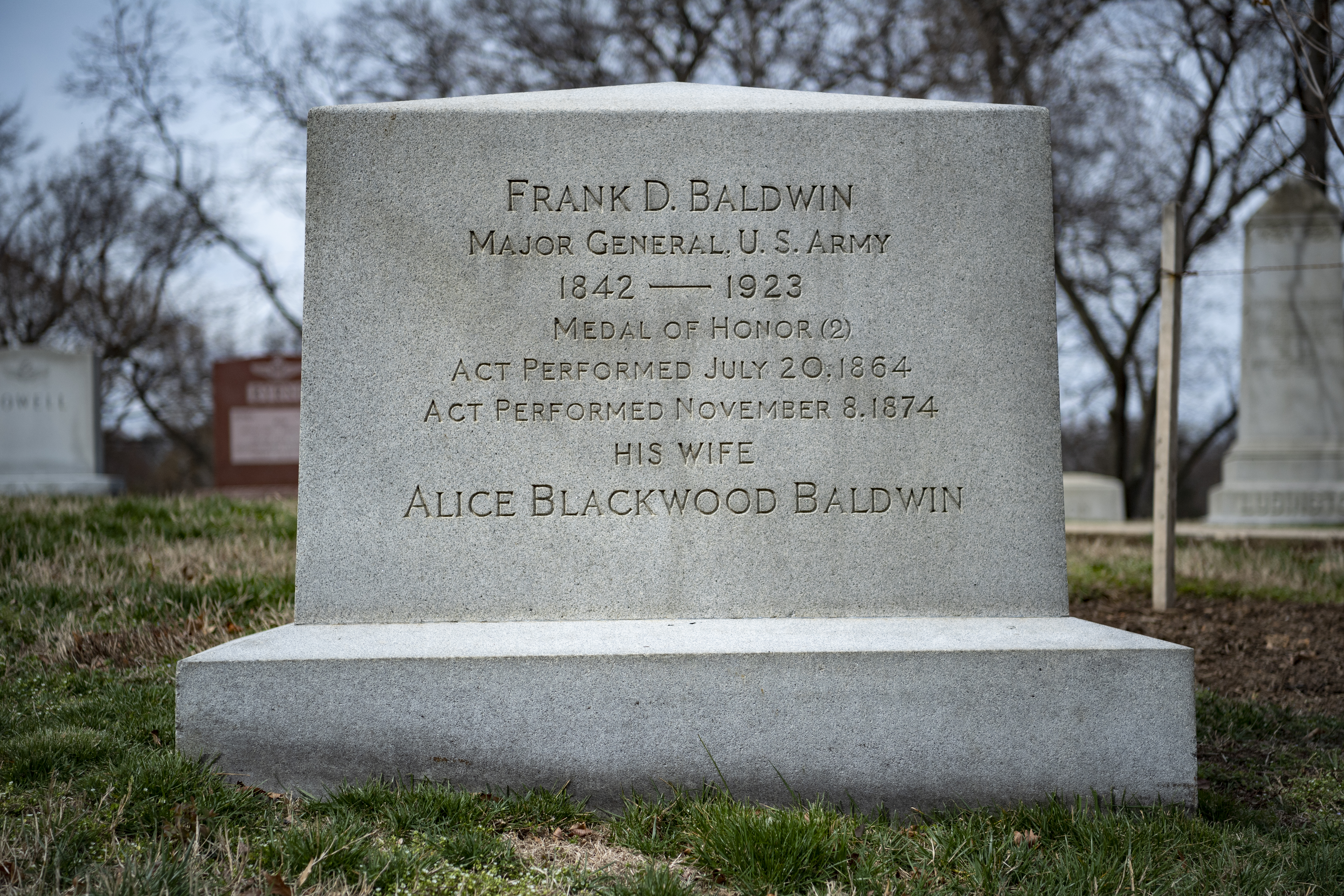
Grave at Arlington National Cemetery

Baldwin served in the Civil War in the 19th Michigan Infantry, initially as a first lieutenant, fighting in all his regiment's battles from 1862 to 1865. In 1864, then-Captain Baldwin participated in General William Tecumseh Sherman's famous March to the Sea, and on July 20 of that year distinguished himself at the Battle of Peachtree Creek, earning his first Medal of Honor.

After the war, he became a student at Hillsdale College, but upon the Reconstruction era reorganization of the Regular Army, he joined the 19th United States Regular Infantry as a second lieutenant in 1866. He was eventually assigned to the 5th U.S. Infantry, with whom he fought in the various frontier conflicts with the Indians. He served with distinction under General Nelson A. Miles as chief of scouts during campaigns against Sitting Bull and Crazy Horse.

On November 8, 1874, while commanding a scout company on escort duty, he led a surprise attack on the camp of Grey Beard, rescuing two young sisters whose parents and brothers had been killed by another Indian band. He was awarded his second Medal of Honor for this action against a larger force in a strong defensive position.

His actions in an attack on an Indian village on the Red River in Montana on December 18, 1876, earned him a brevet of captain, U.S. Regular Army (awarded on February 27, 1890).

Baldwin also served in the Philippines during the Spanish–American War. He was promoted to brigadier general, U.S. Regular Army on June 9, 1902, and he retired in 1906. In 1915, he was advanced to major general on the Army's retired list.

During World War I, Baldwin served as Adjutant General of the Colorado National Guard; appointed to the post in 1917, he served until retiring again in 1919.

On January 10, 1867, he married Alice Blackwood. They had one daughter, Juanita.

General Baldwin was a companion of the Michigan Commandery of the Military Order of the Loyal Legion of the United States.

He died in Denver, Colorado on April 22, 1923, and is buried with his wife Alice at Arlington National Cemetery in Arlington, Virginia.

== Affiliations ==
General Baldwin belonged to numerous fraternal, military and social organizations which included the following:

- Siloam Lodge, No. 35, A. F. & A. M., at Constantine, Michigan (1863)
- Veteran Companion, Military Order of the Loyal Legion of the United States, Colorado Commandery (1892)
- Order of the Indian Wars of the United States, National Commandery at Washington, D. C. (1897)
- Veteran Companion of the Military Order of Foreign Wars, Colorado Commandery (1903)
- Honorary member of General Henry W. Lawton Camp No. 1, United Spanish War Veterans (1905)
- Army & Navy Club of Washington, D.C. (1913)
- National Geographic Society at Washington, D.C. (1916)
- Honorary member of the Denver Club (1903)
- Commercial Club of Albuquerque, New Mexico (1903)
- Yavapai Club of Prescott, Arizona (1903)

== Legacy ==
His wife, Alice Blackwood Baldwin, honored the general's war contributions by compiling and editing the memoirs of her late husband in 1929. Along with General Baldwin, three other two-time Medal of Honor recipients are interred in Arlington National Cemetery (Navy Lieutenant Commander John C. McCloy, Marine Major Louis Cukela, and Marine Corporal John Henry Pruitt).

== Awards ==
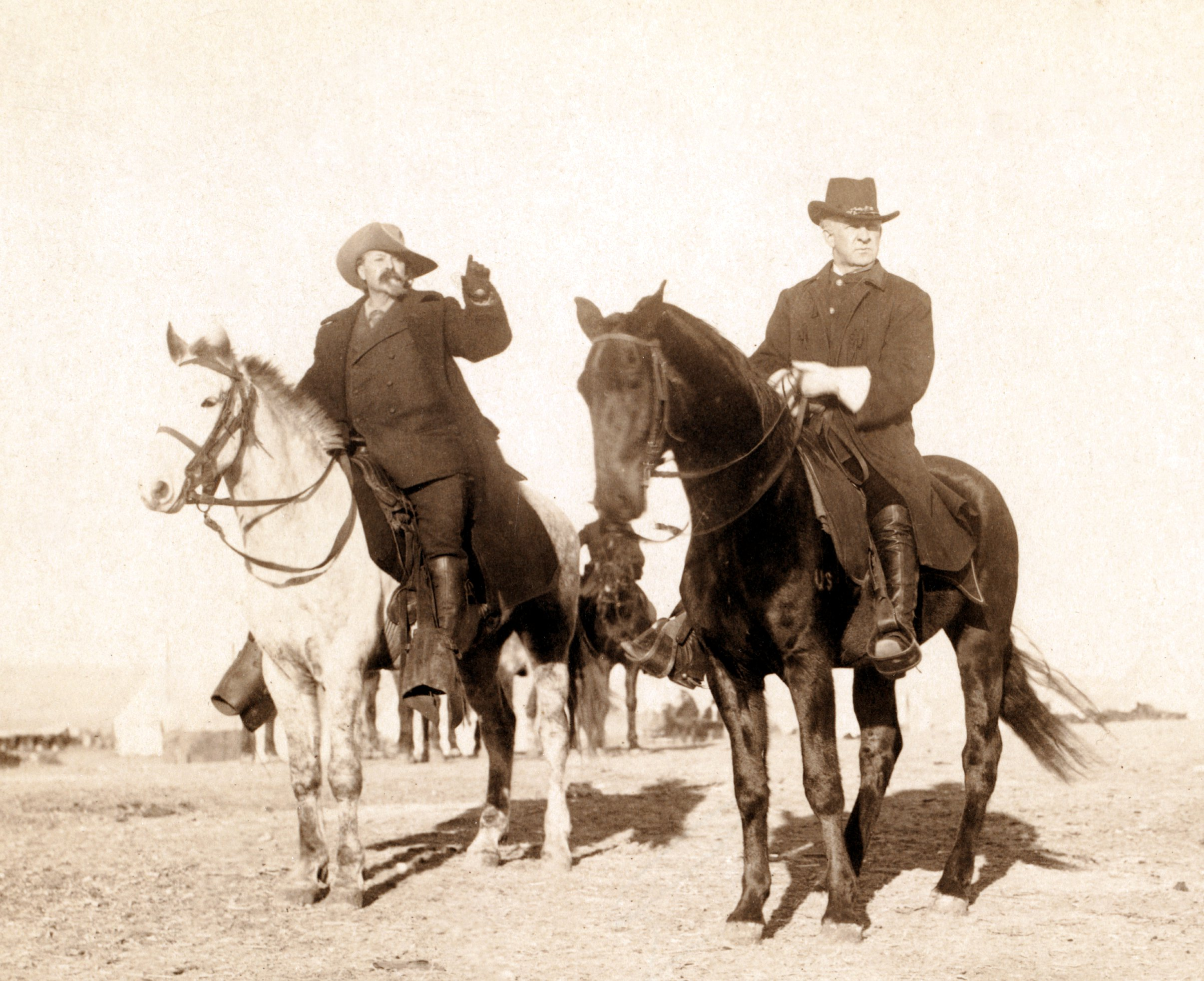
Baldwin (right) with Buffalo Bill in 1891

=== First Medal of Honor ===
Rank and organization: Captain, Company D, 19th Michigan Infantry. Place and date: At Peachtree Creek, Georgia, July 20, 1864. Citation: "Led his company in a countercharge at Peach Tree Creek, Ga., 20 July 1864, under a galling fire ahead of his own men, and singly entered the enemy's line, capturing and bringing back 2 commissioned officers, fully armed, besides a guidon of a Georgia regiment." Date of issue: December 3, 1891.

=== Second Medal of Honor ===
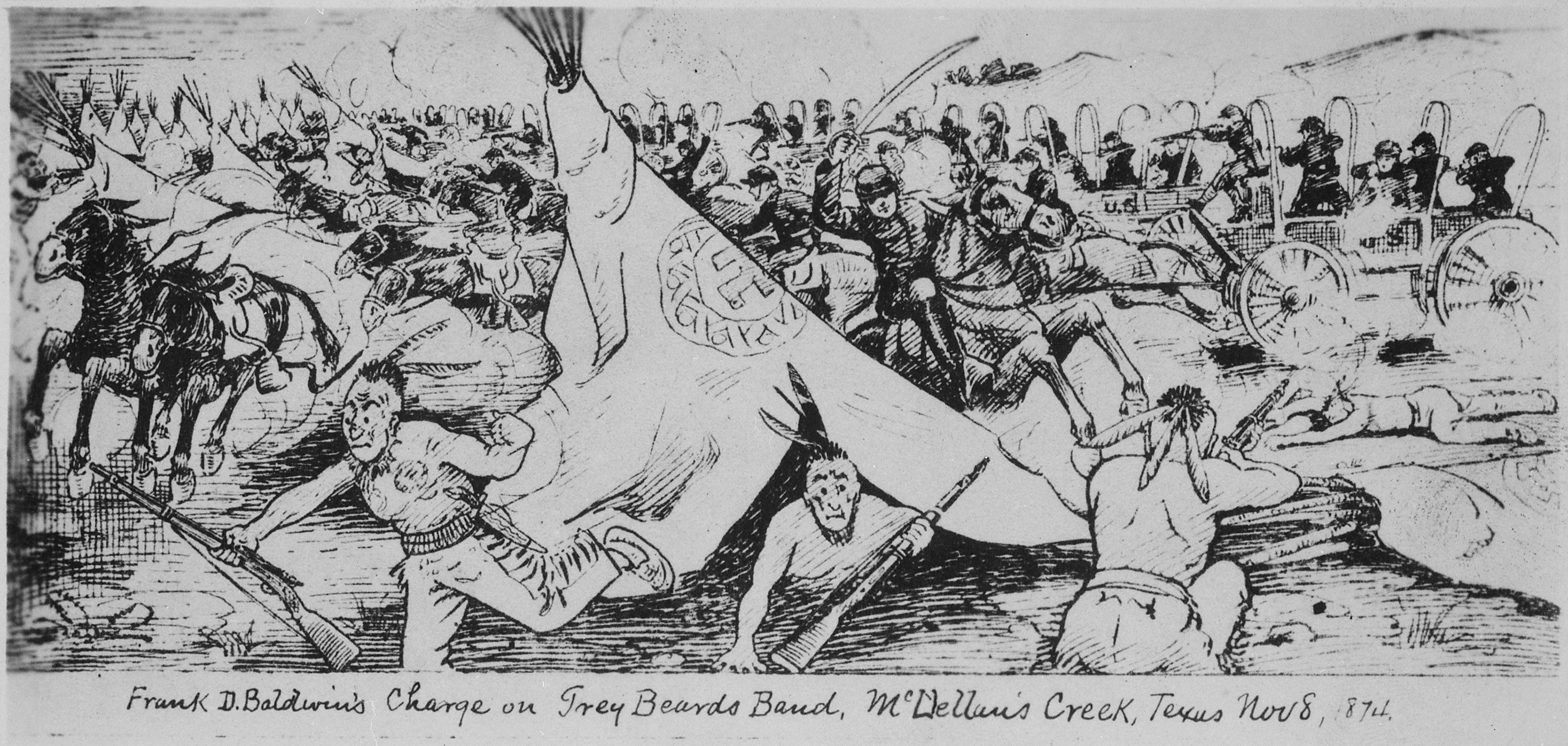
Frank Baldwin's charge on Grey Beard's Band, McClellan's Creek, Texas, November 8, 1874

Rank and organization: First Lieutenant, 5th U.S. Infantry. Place and date: At McClellan's Creek, Texas, November 8, 1874. Citation: "Rescued, with 2 companies, 2 white girls by a voluntary attack upon Indians whose superior numbers and strong position would have warranted delay for reinforcements, but which delay would have permitted the Indians to escape and kill their captives." Date of issue: November 27, 1894.

=== Other awards ===
- Civil War Campaign Medal
- Indian Campaign Medal
- Spanish Campaign Medal
- Philippine Campaign Medal

=== Veteran's Hall of Fame ===
Inducted into the Hillsdale County, Michigan Veteran's Hall of Fame in 2004 for his distinguished service in the American Civil War. Hall of Fame inductee 016, Civil War inductee 004.

== Dates of rank ==
- Second lieutenant, Michigan Horse Guards – 19 September 1861
- Mustered out of service – 22 November 1861
- First lieutenant, 19th Michigan Infantry – 12 August 1862
- Captain, 19th Michigan Infantry – 23 January 1864
- Mustered out – 10 June 1865
- Second lieutenant, 19th Infantry – 23 February 1866
- First lieutenant, 19th Infantry – 10 May 1866
- Captain, 5th Infantry – 27 March 1879
- Brevet major – 27 February 1890
- Major, 5th Infantry – 26 April 1898
- Lieutenant colonel, Inspector General, Volunteers – 20 June 1898
- Discharged from Volunteers – 12 May 1899
- Lieutenant colonel, 4th Infantry – 18 December 1899
- Colonel, 27th Infantry – 26 July 1901
- Brigadier general, United States Army – 2 June 1902
- Retired – 26 June 1906
- Major general, United States Army, Retired – 4 March 1915

== See also ==
- List of Medal of Honor recipients
- List of American Civil War Medal of Honor recipients: A–F
