= Melvin Whitson Mills =

American lawyer

Melvin W. Mills

Personal details
- Born: October 11, 1845; Sparta, Canada West
- Died: August 19, 1925 (aged 79); Springer, New Mexico, United States
- Spouse: Ella E. House
- Occupation: Photojournalist, Attorney

Melvin Mills' Mansion in Springer New Mexico

Melvin Whitson Mills (October 11, 1845 – August 19, 1925) was a member of the New Mexico Territorial Legislature.

== Family ==
Mills was a descendant of the Mills and Chase families, who were quakers that immigrated during early part of 18th Century from Canada to The United States. They formed a part of a colony and established themselves on the north shore of Lake Erie. The parents of Melvin W. Mills, after a brief residence in Canada, moved to Michigan, United States. In 1860 his father immigrated to the west and nine years later, his wife and child followed.

== Education ==
Mills graduated from Ann Arbor Law School at the University of Michigan.

== Career ==
He joined his father at the Moreno Mines, Colfax County, New Mexico, and there began and continued the practice of law.

Colfax County, New Mexico, in which spent his later years, had been the seat of many internal insurrections, and hundreds of people had been hung, shot, and killed in various ways over local difficulties. The law could not be enforced at times; the courts could not be held since the civil authorities where often at the mercy of the outlaws and worst types of desperados.

While in Cimarron, New Mexico he was twice elected to the territorial legislature, and has held various other offices such as county and city attorney for Elizabethtown, and was District Attorney for a number of counties.

Melvin Mills owned a large ranch in Springer, New Mexico, while a cattle owner and was in control of one of the largest mercantile and banking company at the time.
