= Mochi (Cheyenne) =

Cheyenne warrior and prisoner of war (1841 – 1881)

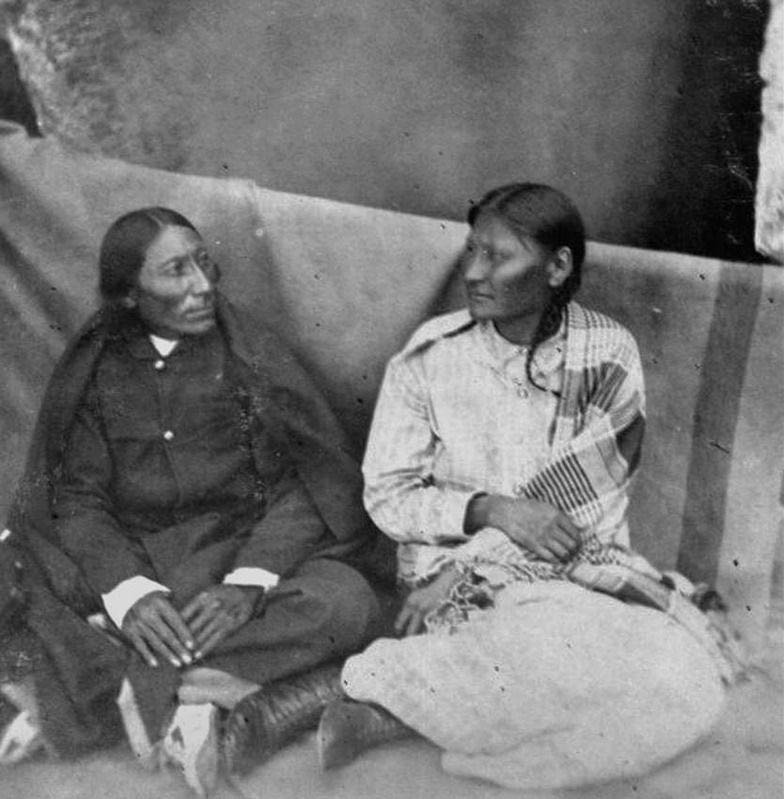
Mochi (right side) photographed while imprisoned at Fort Marion in St. Augustine, Florida. (c. 1875)

Mochi (Cheyenne: Mo'ėsa'e, transl. "Buffalo Calf"; c. 1841 – 1881) was a Southern Cheyenne woman of the Tsitsistas band and the wife of Chief Medicine Water. Mochi, then a 24-year-old, was a member of Black Kettle's camp and was present on the morning of November 29, 1864, when John Chivington and over 650 troops of the First Colorado Cavalry, Third Colorado Cavalry and a company of the 1st Regiment New Mexico Volunteer Cavalry attacked Black Kettle's winter camp at Sand Creek on the plains of eastern Colorado Territory (referred to as the Sand Creek Massacre).

During the unprovoked attack, Mochi witnessed her mother being shot in the forehead and killed by a U.S. soldier who had entered their tipi. According to her account, he then attempted to rape her, prompting her to shoot and kill him with her grandfather's rifle. She then fled the camp with the other survivors trying to evade Chivington's men. After the massacre, she became a warrior and engaged in raiding and warfare for the next 11 years.

Mochi fought alongside her husband in numerous battles and raids and was the only Native American woman to be incarcerated by the United States Army as a prisoner of war.

== Lone Tree massacre ==
On August 24, 1874, in present-day Meade County, Kansas, Mochi, Medicine Water and the other members of their band were involved in the massacre of a surveying party led by Capt. Oliver Francis Short, who had fought in the Union Army during the American Civil War. Short, his 14-year-old son Truman, and four other members of the party were killed, with three of them being scalped.

== German family massacre ==
On the morning of September 11, 1874, in Kansas, Chief Medicine Water and his band, including Mochi, attacked John German and his family as they were breaking camp. The family had camped along the stagecoach route which followed the Smoky Hill River while en route to Fort Wallace.

German, his wife Liddia (Cox), son Stephen Wise, and daughters Rebecca Jane and Joanna Cleveland were killed and scalped, with Mochi killing Liddia with a tomahawk blow to the skull. After plundering the camp and setting fire to the wagon, the band took German's four youngest daughters captive. They were Catherine Elizabeth, age seventeen; Sophia Louisa, twelve; Julia Arminda, seven; and Nancy Addie, five.

Julia and Nancy were traded to Grey Beard's band and were liberated after an attack on his camp on November 8, 1874, by a column led by Lieut. Frank Baldwin. Catherine and Sophia were released in March when Chief Stone Calf and most of the Southern Cheyenne surrendered at Fort Leavenworth, in Kansas.

== Fort Marion ==
Mochi and her husband Medicine Water were among 35 Cheyenne singled out for incarceration in the east. They were among a larger contingent of Plains tribe members to be sent east; in addition to the Cheyenne, there were 27 Kiowa, 11 Comanche, and 1 Caddo. Two of the Cheyenne died en route, including Grey Beard, who was thwarted in a suicide attempt only to be shot and killed trying to escape.

After being incarcerated at Fort Sill in Indian Territory, they were taken in eight prison wagons to Fort Leavenworth and then loaded in a special train for the journey to St. Augustine, Florida. In St. Augustine, Mochi and the others were incarcerated in an old coquina stone fort built by the Spanish in the 17th century. The fort, originally named the Castillo de San Marcos, was renamed Fort Marion by the Americans.

Mochi and the others would remain in captivity at the fort under the supervision of Captain Richard Pratt until 1878. Upon her release, she returned to Oklahoma and died in 1881, in what is present day Clinton, Oklahoma.
