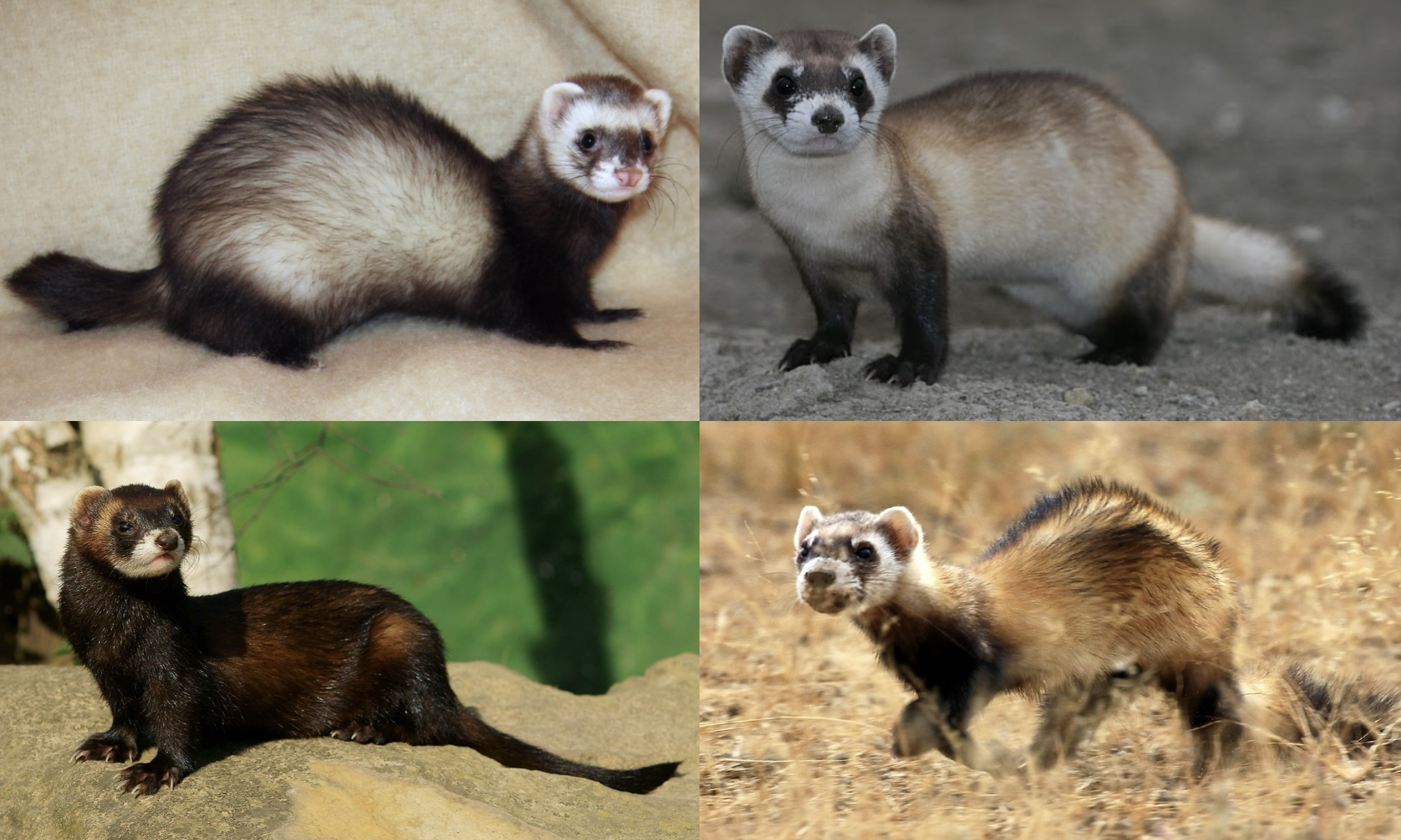

Scientific classification
- Kingdom: Animalia
- Phylum: Chordata
- Class: Mammalia
- Infraclass: Placentalia
- Order: Carnivora
- Family: Mustelidae
- Genus: Mustela
- Subgenus: Putorius; Cuvier, 1817

Species
- Mustela eversmannii; Mustela furo; Mustela nigripes; Mustela putorius

= Putorius =

Subgenus of mammals

Polecats (subgenus Putorius) are mustelids in the genus Mustela. It includes four living species — the black-footed ferret or American polecat (Mustela nigripes), the domestic ferret (Mustela furo), the European polecat (Mustela putorius), and the steppe polecat (Mustela eversmanii). Polecats share the genus Mustela with members of the subgenera Lutreola and Mustela.

Putorius was first described in 1817 by Georges Cuvier and included multiple related species. This was until 1877 when Putorius was reclassified to only include three species. In 1982, the subgenus Cynomyonax (black-footed ferrets) was merged into Putorius. The common ancestor of all species in Putorius used to live in central Eurasia. Eventually, a population of steppe polecat migrated to North America and evolved into the black-footed ferret.

== Taxonomy ==
A subgenus with the name Putorius was first described by Georges Cuvier in his 1817 work Le Règne Animal (The Animal Kingdom). Steppe polecats and black-footed ferrets had not yet been described until 1827 and 1851 respectively. This original Putorius classification featured a much more wider array of animals, which included the European polecat and domestic ferret, alongside the American mink ("Polecat of the North American rivers"), Amazon weasel ("African ferret"), European mink, least weasel, marbled polecat, Malayan weasel, Siberian weasel, stoat, striped polecat, and "striped Madagascar ferret".

In 1877, American historian Elliott Coues split the Putorius into multiple subgenuses and reclassified only the European polecat, domestic ferret and steppe polecat into Putorius. The black-footed ferret, which had features of Putorius and Gale (a subgenus split from Putorius), was put into its own subgenus Cynomyonax. The modern classification arose in 1982 when Phillip M. Youngman placed the black-footed ferret into Putorius. The ancestor of modern polecats and ferrets and earliest true polecat is considered to be Mustela stromeri, a smaller species whose size indicated polecats evolved at a late period.

=== Extant species ===
Name	Distribution	Subspecies	Image
Black-footed ferret or American polecat (Mustela nigripes)	Several pockets of land in central North America; in Canada, the United States, and Mexico	Monotypic	
Domestic ferret (Mustela furo)	Worldwide (domesticated), New Zealand (non-native)	May be considered a subspecies of Mustela putorius.	
European polecat (Mustela putorius)	Europe, Morocco, and northern Asia	6 or 7	
Steppe polecat (Mustela eversmanii)	Southeast Europe; northern and southern Asia	7	

== Distribution, ecology, and diet ==
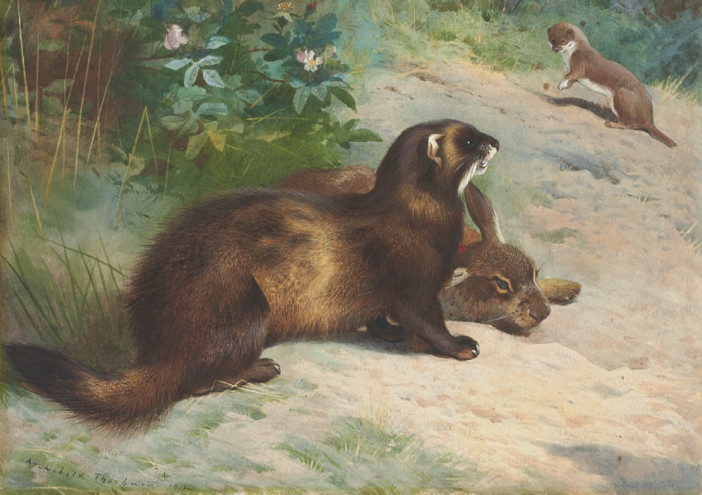
Scottish polecat guarding a rabbit carcass from a least weasel, as painted by Archibald Thorburn

Originally, the common ancestor of members in Putorius, Mustela stromeri, lived in large territories of central Eurasia, with most skulls commonly unearthed in Eastern Europe. The range extended into North American when a population of steppe polecat (Mustela eversmannii berengii) crossed the Bering land bridge. This subspecies evolved into modern black-footed ferrets.

Most members eat rodents. 90% of the black-footed ferret's diet is made up of prairie dogs, followed by other small rodents and lagomorphs. The European polecat primarily feeds on mouse-like rodents, followed by amphibians and birds. The steppe polecat's predominant prey is the common vole, though it hunts more frequently on hamsters during spring and the summer.

== Conservation status ==
The IUCN Red List lists European and steppe polecats as "Least Concern" as both have widespread areas with large population. However, black-footed polecats are listed as "Endangered" and it is estimated that there are 350 black-footed ferrets living in the wild. The main threats to black-footed polecats are disease, habitat loss, and human-introduced diseases. The European polecat's main threat is vehicle collisions, and other threats include traps and poisoning through rats and other small mammals exposed to rodenticides.
