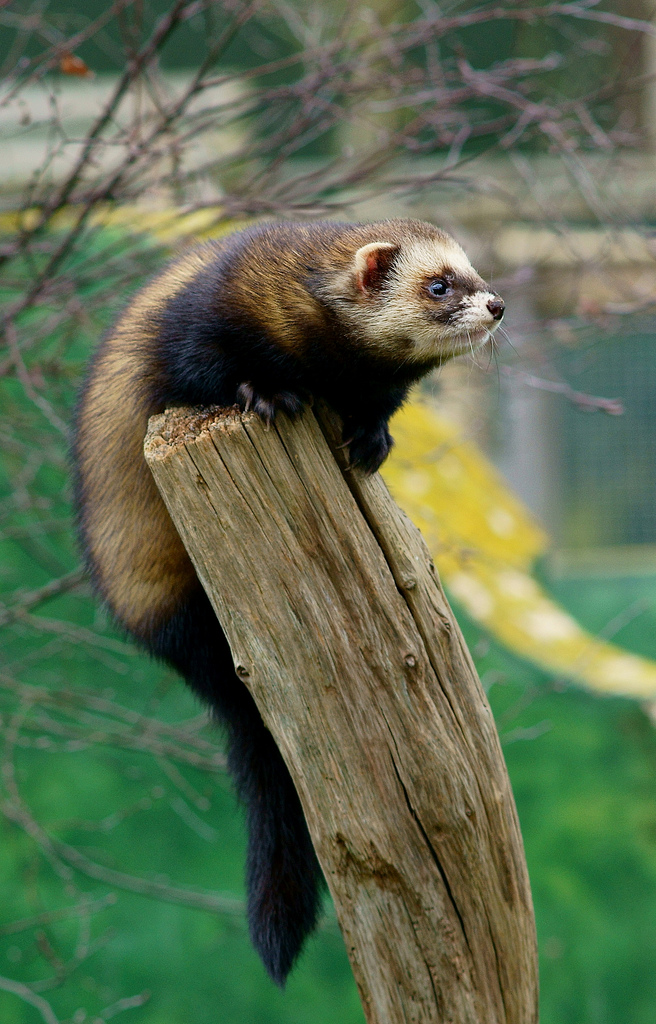
- Welsh polecat (M. p. anglia) at the British Wildlife Centre, Newchapel, Surrey

Conservation status
- Least Concern (IUCN 3.1)

Scientific classification
- Kingdom: Animalia
- Phylum: Chordata
- Class: Mammalia
- Order: Carnivora
- Family: Mustelidae
- Genus: Mustela
- Subgenus: Putorius
- Species: M. putorius

Binomial name
- Mustela putorius Linnaeus, 1758
- Geographic range

= European polecat =

European polecat Temporal range: Middle Pleistocene – Recent

Ferret-like mammal species

The European polecat (Mustela putorius), also known as the western polecat, is a mustelid species occurring in Europe and the Rif mountains. It is of a generally dark brown colour, with a pale underbelly and a dark mask across the face. Occasionally, colour mutations including albinos, leucists, isabellinists, xanthochromists, amelanists, and erythrists occur. It has a shorter, more compact body than other Mustela species, a more powerfully built skull and dentition, is less agile, and is well known for having the characteristic ability to secrete a particularly foul-smelling liquid to mark its territory.

It is much less territorial than other mustelids, with animals of the same sex frequently sharing home ranges. Like other mustelids, the European polecat is polygamous, with pregnancy occurring after mating, following induced ovulation. It usually gives birth in early summer to litters consisting of five to ten kits, which become independent at the age of two to three months. The European polecat feeds on small rodents, birds, amphibians and reptiles. It occasionally cripples its prey by piercing its brain with its teeth and stores it, still living, in its burrow for future consumption.

The European polecat originated in Western Europe during the Middle Pleistocene, with its closest living relatives being the steppe polecat, the black-footed ferret and the European mink. With the two former species, it can produce fertile offspring, though hybrids between it and the latter species tend to be sterile, and are distinguished from their parent species by their larger size and more valuable pelts.

The European polecat is thought to be the sole ancestor of the ferret, which was domesticated more than 2,000 years ago for the purpose of hunting vermin. The species has otherwise been historically viewed negatively by humans. In Britain especially, the polecat was persecuted by gamekeepers, and became synonymous with promiscuity in early English literature. During modern times, the polecat is still scantly represented in popular culture when compared to other rare British mammals, and misunderstandings of its behaviour still persist in some rural areas. Since 2008, it has been classified as Least Concern on the IUCN Red List due to its wide range and large numbers.

== Etymology and naming ==
Polcat, as it appears in The Pardoner's Tale from the Ellesmere Chaucer

The word "polecat" first appeared after the Norman Conquest of England, written (in Middle English) as polcat. While the second syllable is largely self-explanatory, the origin of the first is unclear. It is possibly derived from the French poule, meaning "chicken", likely in reference to the species' fondness for poultry, or it may be a variant of the Old English fūl, meaning "foul". In Middle English, the species was referred to as foumart, meaning "foul marten", in reference to its strong odour. In Old French, the polecat was called fissau, which was derived from the Low German and Scandinavian verb for "to make a disagreeable smell". This was later corrupted in English as fitchew or fitchet, which itself became the word "fitch", which is used for the polecat's pelt. The word fitchet is the root word for the North American fisher, which was named by Dutch colonists in America who noted similarities between the two species. In some countries such as New Zealand, the term "fitch" has taken on a wider use to refer to related creatures such as ferrets, especially when farmed for their fur.

A 2002 article in The Mammal Society's Mammal Review contested the European polecat's status as an animal indigenous to Britain on account of a scarce fossil record and linguistic evidence. Unlike most native British mammals, the polecat's Welsh name (ffwlbart, derived from the Middle English foulmart) is not of Celtic origin, much as the Welsh names of invasive species such as the European rabbit and fallow deer (cwningen, derived from the Middle English konyng and danas, derived from the Old French dain, respectively) are of Middle English or Old French origin. Polecats are not mentioned in Anglo-Saxon or Welsh literature prior to the Norman conquest of England in 1066, with the first recorded mention of the species in the Welsh language occurring in the 14th century's Llyfr Coch Hergest and in English in Chaucer's The Pardoner's Tale (1383). In contrast, attestations of the Welsh word for pine marten (bele), date back at least to the 10th century Welsh Laws and possibly much earlier in northern England.

=== Local and indigenous names ===
==== Dialectal English names ====
Probably no other animal on the British list has had as many colloquial names as the polecat. In southern England it was generally referred to as 'fitchou' whereas in the north it was 'foumat or foumard... However there were a host of others including endless spelling variations: philbert, fulmer, fishock, filibart, poulcat, poll cat, etc. Charles Oldham identified at least 20 different versions of the name in the Hertfordshire/Bedfordshire area alone.

— Roger Lovegrove (2007)

Indigenous names for Mustela putorius
Linguistic group or area	Dialectal name
Anglo-Manx	Foul-cat
Craven/Leeds/South Lancashire	Pow-cat
Durham	Foomart
Herefordshire	Fitchuck
Lancashire	Foomurt
Scots	Foumart, Thummurt, Thoomurt

=== Latin name ===
As well as the several indigenous names referring to smell (see above), the scientific name Mustela putorius is also derived from this species' foul smell. The Latin putorius translates to "stench" or "stink" and is the origin of the English word putrid.

== Evolution ==
The earliest true polecat was Mustela stromeri, which appeared during the late Villafranchian. It was considerably smaller than the present form, thus indicating polecats evolved at a relatively late period. The oldest modern polecat fossils occur in Germany, Britain and France, and date back to the Middle Pleistocene. The European polecat's closest relatives are the steppe polecat and black-footed ferret, with which it is thought to have shared Mustela stromeri as a common ancestor. The European polecat is, however, not as maximally adapted in the direction of carnivory as the steppe polecat, being less specialised in skull structure and dentition. The European polecat likely diverged from the steppe polecat 1.5 million years ago based on IRBP, though cytochrome b transversions indicate a younger date of 430,000 years. It is also closely related to the European mink, with which it can hybridise.

=== Domestication ===
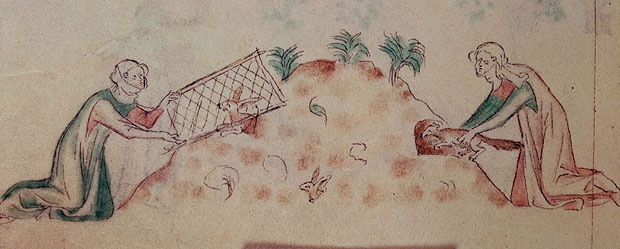
Women hunting rabbits with a ferret in the Queen Mary Psalter

Morphological, cytological and molecular studies confirm the European polecat is the sole ancestor of the ferret, thus disproving any connection with the steppe polecat, which was once thought to have contributed to the ferret's creation. Ferrets were first mentioned by Aristophanes in 425 BC and by Aristotle in 350 BC. Greek and Roman writers in the first century AD were the first to attest on the ferret's use in bolting rabbits from their burrows. The first accurate descriptions of ferrets come from Strabo during 200 AD, when ferrets were released onto the Balearic Islands to control rabbit populations. As the European rabbit is native to the Iberian Peninsula and northwest Africa, the European polecat likely was first domesticated in these regions.

The ferret and European polecat are similar in both size and portions, to the point that dark-coloured ferrets are almost indistinguishable from their wild cousins, though the ferret's skull has a smaller cranial volume, and has a narrower postorbital constriction. Compared to the European polecat, the ferret has a much smaller brain, though this comparison has not been made with Mediterranean polecats, from which ferrets likely derive. The theory of a Mediterranean origin is further strengthened because the ferret is less tolerant of cold than northern polecat subspecies. Unlike other subspecies, which are largely solitary, the ferret will readily live in social groups. The ferret is also slower in all its movements than the polecat, and hardly ever makes any use of its anal scent glands. Overall, the ferret represents a neotenous form of polecat.

=== Subspecies ===
As of 2005, seven subspecies are recognised.

Subspecies	Trinomial authority	Description	Range	Synonyms
Common polecat M. p. putorius (Nominate subspecies)	Linnaeus, 1758	Larger than mosquensis, with darker, fluffier and more lustrous fur	Western European Russia, western Belarus, western Ukraine, Central and Western Europe and North Africa	flavicans (de Sélys Longchamps, 1839) foetens (Thunberge, 1789) foetidus (Gray, 1843) iltis (Boddaert, 1785) infectus (Ogérien, 1863) manium (Barrett-Hamilton, 1904) putorius (Blyth, 1842) verus (Brandt in Simashko, 1851) vison (de Sélys Longchamps, 1839) vulgaris (Griffith, 1827)
Welsh polecat M. p. anglia	Pocock, 1936		England and Wales	
Mediterranean polecat M. p. aureola	Barrett-Hamilton, 1904	A small subspecies with yellowish underfur; it may be the ancestral subspecies from which the domestic ferret is derived, based on the characteristics of the teeth.	The southern and western portions of the Iberian Peninsula	
†Scottish polecat M. p. caledoniae	Tetley, 1939		Scotland	
Domestic ferret M. p. furo	Linnaeus, 1758	A domesticated form, its skull is generally typical in conformation to the nominate subspecies, though with features in common with the steppe polecat. Typically, the dark facial fur does not extend to the nose, while the pale cheek patches are very extensive and contrast poorly with the dark mask. One or more paws may be white, with white guard hairs often being well distributed over the body, particularly on the hind quarters.	Worldwide in association with humans	albus (Bechstein, 1801) furoputorius (Link, 1795) subrufo (Gray, 1865)
Middle Russian polecat M. p. mosquensis	Heptner, 1966	A small subspecies, with relatively light, slightly fluffy fur with little lustre	European Russia	orientalis (Brauner, 1929) orientalis (Polushina, 1955) ognevi (Kratochvil)
Carpathian polecat M. p. rothschildi	Pocock, 1932	A very lightly coloured subspecies, its fur closely approaches that of the steppe polecat.	Dobruja, Romania	

== Description ==
=== Build ===
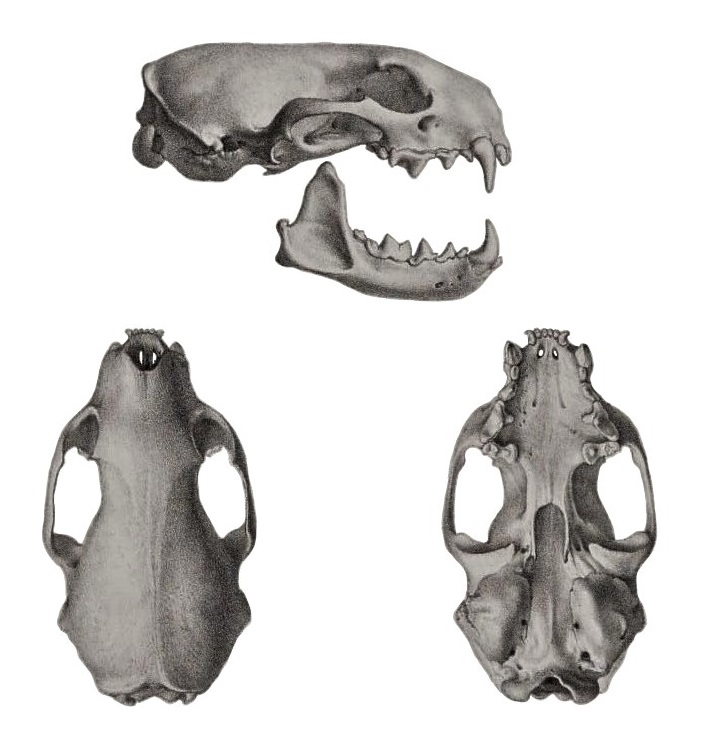
Skull

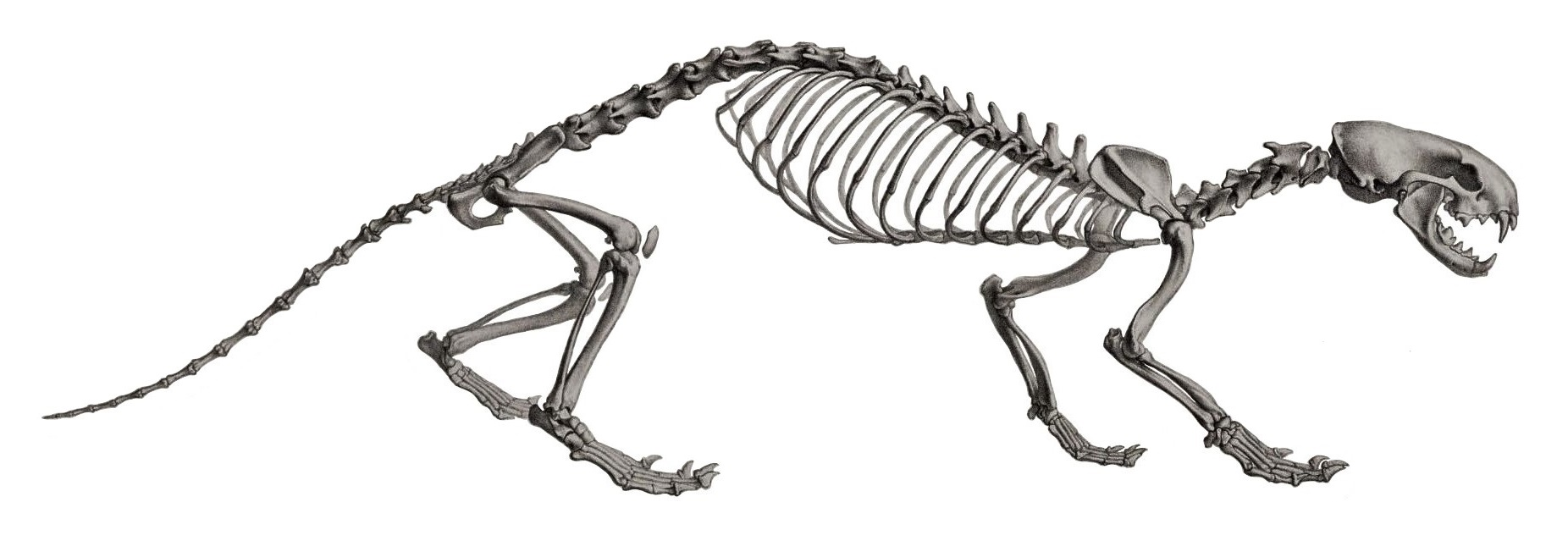
Skeleton

The appearance of the European polecat is typical of members of the genus Mustela, though it is generally more compact in conformation and, although short-legged, has a less elongated body than the European mink or steppe polecat. The tail is short, about one-third its body length. The eyes are small, with dark brown irises. The hind toes are long and partially webbed, with weakly curved 4 mm-long, nonretractable claws. The front claws are strongly curved, partially retractable, and measure 6 mm in length. The feet are moderately long and more robust than in other members of the genus. The polecat's skull is relatively coarse and massive, more so than the mink's, with a strong, but short and broad facial region and strongly developed projections. In comparison to other similarly sized mustelids, the polecat's teeth are very strong, large and massive in relation to skull size. Sexual dimorphism in the skull is apparent in the lighter, narrower skull of the female, which also has weaker projections. The polecat's running gait is not as complex and twisting as that of the mink or stoat, and it is not as fast as the mountain weasel (solongoi), stoat or least weasel, as it can be outrun by a conditioned man. Its sensory organs are well developed, though it is unable to distinguish between colours.

The dimensions of the European polecat vary greatly. The species does not conform to Bergmann's rule, with the pattern of size variation seeming to follow a trend of size increase along an east–west axis. Males measure 350–460 mm (14–18 in) in body length and females are 290–394 mm (11–16 in). The tail measures 115–167 mm in males and 84–150 mm in females. Adult males in middle Europe weigh 1,000–1,500 grams (35–53 oz) and females 650–815 grams (23–29 oz). Gigantism is known among polecats, but specimens exhibiting this are likely the products of polecat-mink hybridisation.

=== Fur ===
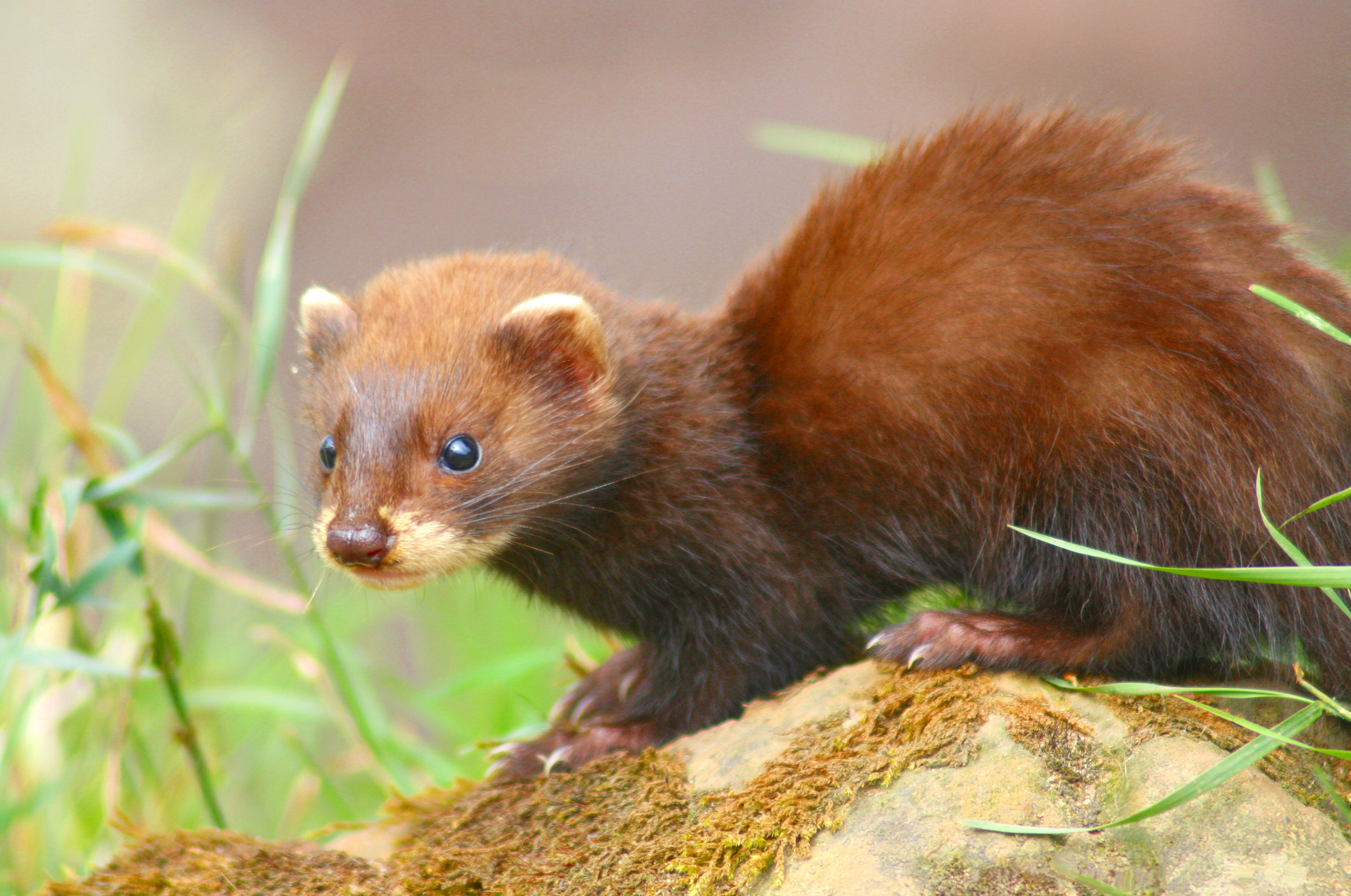
A young erythristic Welsh polecat at the British Wildlife Centre, Surrey, England

The winter fur of the European polecat is brownish black or blackish brown, the intensity of which is determined by the colour of the long guard hairs. On the back and flanks, the dark tone is brightened by bright whitish-yellowish, sometimes yellowish-greyish underfur which shows through. The lightly coloured underfur is not equally visible on different parts of the body. On the back and hindquarters, the underfur is almost completely covered by the dark guard hairs. On the flanks, though, the lightening is well defined, and contrasts sharply with the general tone of the back. The throat, lower neck, chest and abdomen are black or blackish brown. The limbs are pure black or black with brown tints, while the tail is black or blackish brown, completely lacking light underfur. The area around and between the eyes is black-brown, with a longitudinal stripe of similar colour along the top of the nose. The ears are dark brown and edged with white. The summer fur is short, sparse and coarse. It is greyer, duller and lacking in the lustre of the winter fur. The underfur is more weakly developed in the summer fur, and has a brownish-grey or rusty-grey colour. The polecat is a good swimmer, but its fur is not as well insulated against cold water as the American mink's; while a mink will take 118 minutes to cool in a water temperature of 8 °C (46 °F), the polecat cools down much faster at 26–28 minutes.

Polecats were found in two major phenotypes: a typical one and a dark fur one with no black mask. Colour mutations include albinos, leucists, isabellinists, xanthochromists, amelanists, and erythrists. In typical erythristic individuals, the underfur is usually bright reddish. The guard hairs on the trunk are bright reddish or reddish brown. Black guard hairs are absent on the lower body and head. In some rare cases, the guard hairs are so light, they are almost indistinguishable from the pale-yellow underfur. These individuals are called "amelanistic". In these cases, the whole animal is a very light golden-yellow colour. These individuals are called "isabelline" or "xanthochromistic".

== Behaviour ==
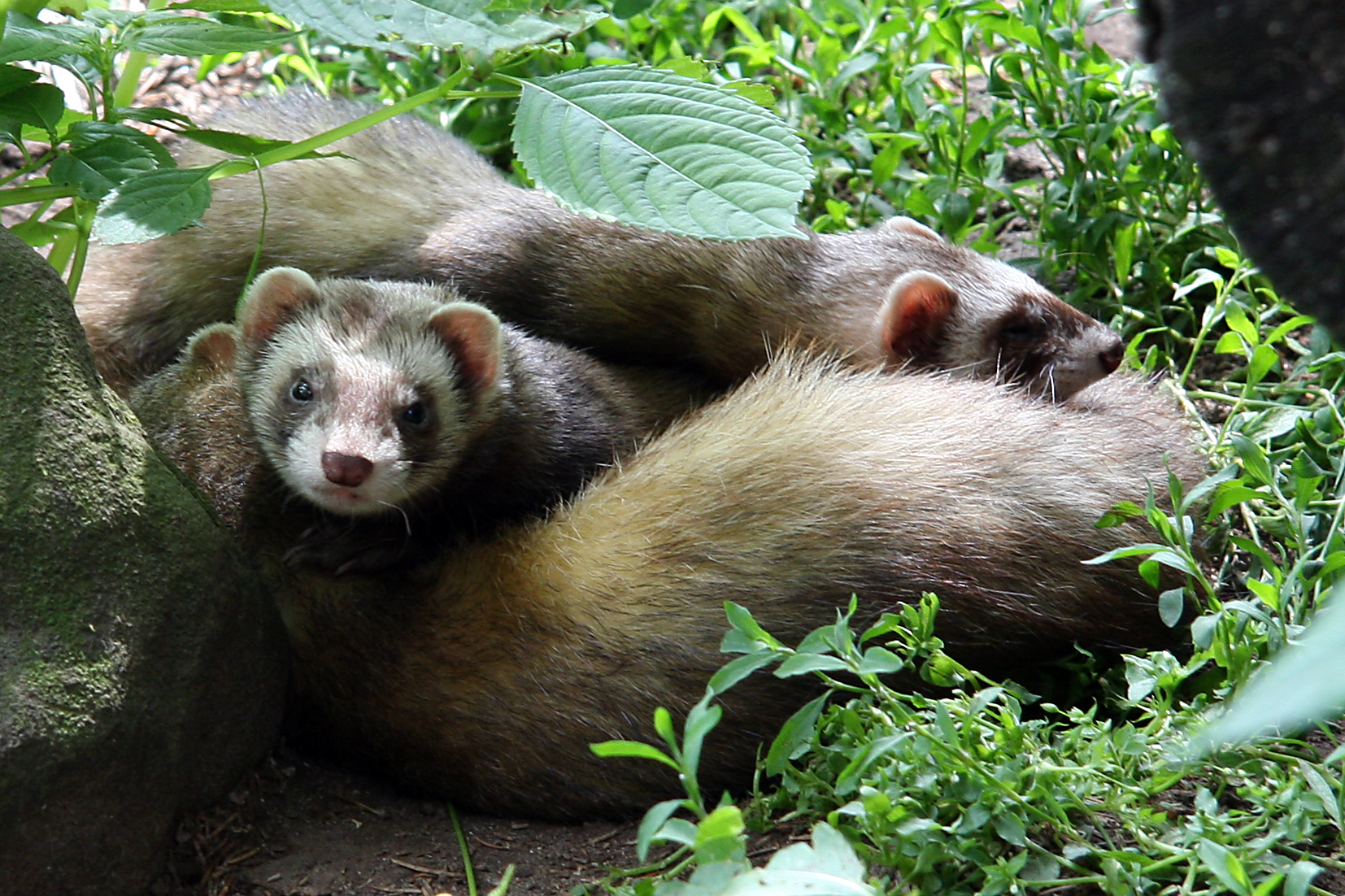
A group of common polecats in Sweden

=== Social and territorial behaviour ===
The European polecat has definite home ranges that vary according to season, habitat, sex and social status. Breeding females settle in discrete areas, whereas breeding males and dispersing juveniles have more fluid home ranges, and are more mobile. Both males and females share home ranges with other members of the same sex; males have larger home ranges than females, but evidence of territorial marking is sparse.

European polecats use several den sites distributed throughout their home ranges and are often most active around rabbit warrens. Some European polecats use farm buildings or haystacks as daytime resting sites in winter. Occasionally, European polecats use abandoned European badger or red fox burrows. Like other mustelids, the polecat is usually a silent animal, though it will growl fiercely when angered, and squeak when distressed. It also emits a low, mewling cry to its mate or offspring.

=== Reproduction and development ===
The European polecat is a seasonal breeder, with no courtship rituals. During the mating season, the male grabs the female by the neck and drags her about to stimulate ovulation, then copulates for up to an hour. The species is polygamous, with each male polecat mating with several females. The gestation period lasts 40–43 days, with litters usually being born in May-early June. Each litter typically consists of five to ten kits. At birth, the kits weigh 9–10 g (0.32–0.35 oz) and measure 55–70 mm (2.2–2.8 in) in body length; they are blind and deaf. At the age of one week, the kits are covered in silky, white fur, which is replaced with a cinnamon brown-greyish woolly coat at the age of 3–4 wk. Weaning begins at three weeks of age, while the permanent dentition erupts after 7–8 wk. The kits become independent after two to three months. Females are very protective of their young, and have even been known to confront humans approaching too closely to their litters.

== Ecology ==
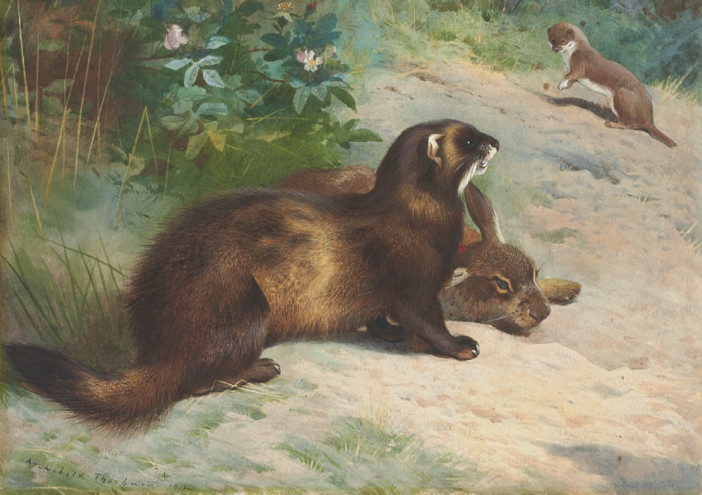
Scottish polecat guarding a rabbit carcass from a least weasel, as painted by Archibald Thorburn

=== Diet ===
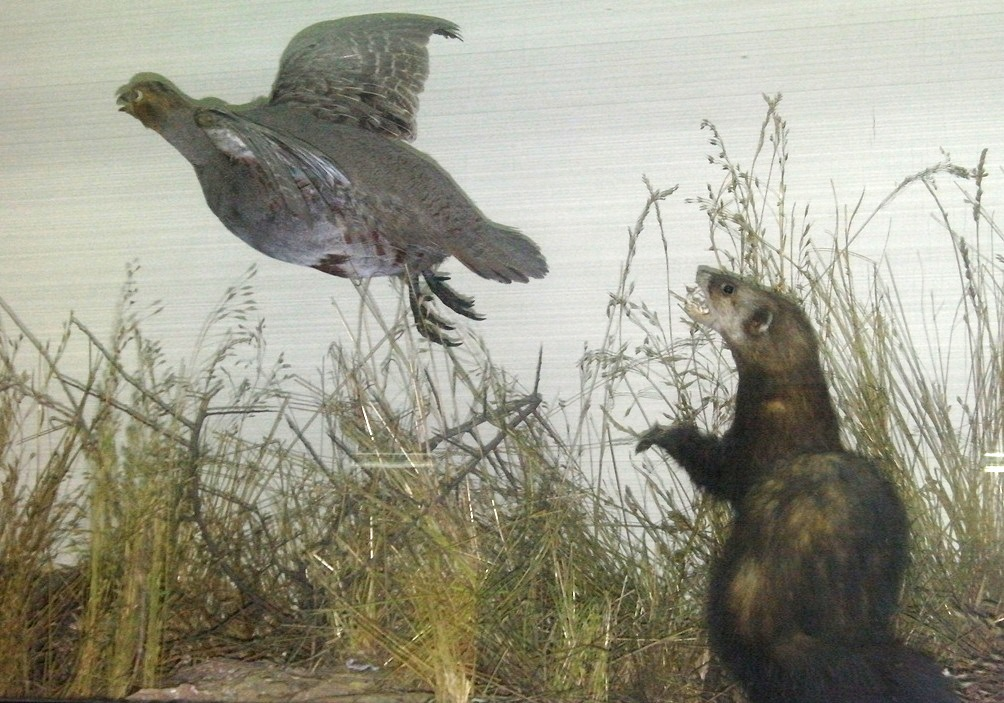
Common polecat attacking a grey partridge, as exhibited at the Bulgarian National Museum of Natural History

The European polecat's diet consists of mouse-like rodents, followed by amphibians and birds. Its most frequent prey item in the former Soviet Union is the common vole and rarely the red-backed vole. In large river floodlands, water vole are common prey. In spring and winter, amphibians (especially grass frogs and green toads) become important food items. Selective predation on male frogs by the polecat decreases the occurrence of polyandry in frog populations. However, because amphibians have little calorific value, the polecat never grows fat on them, no matter how many it consumes. In Central Europe, the diet in winter months is dominated by birds including quail, grey partridges, grouse, chickens, pigeons and passerines. Seasonal changes in the activity rhythm is synchronised with the activity of the main prey. Some species only rarely preyed upon by the polecat include European hedgehogs, asp vipers, grass snakes, lizards and insects. In Britain, it commonly kills brown rats and European rabbits, and is capable of killing larger prey, such as geese and hares. One polecat was reported to frequently wait at a riverbank and catch eels, which it took back to its burrow. The European polecat hunts its prey by stalking it and seizing it with its canine teeth, killing the animal with a bite to the neck. This killing method is instinctive, but perfected with practice. The polecat sometimes caches its food, particularly during seasonal gluts of frogs and toads. Sometimes, the polecat does not kill these, but bites them at the base of the skull, thus paralyzing them and keeping them fresh for later consumption. Although they are normally shy around humans, naturalist Alfred Brehm in his Brehms Tierleben mentions an exceptional case in which three polecats attacked a baby in Hesse. During winter, some European polecats raid beehives and feed on honey.

=== Enemies and competitors ===
Although the European polecat can coexist with the European mink, it suffers in areas where the invasive American mink also occurs, as the latter species feeds on the same mammals as the polecat much more frequently than the European mink, and has been known to drive the polecat out of wetland habitats. In areas where the European polecat is sympatric with the steppe polecat, the two species overlap greatly in choice of food, though the former tends to consume more household foods and birds, while the latter preys on mammals more frequently. There is at least one record of a beech marten killing a polecat. The European polecat may prey on the much smaller least weasel.

== Hybridisation ==
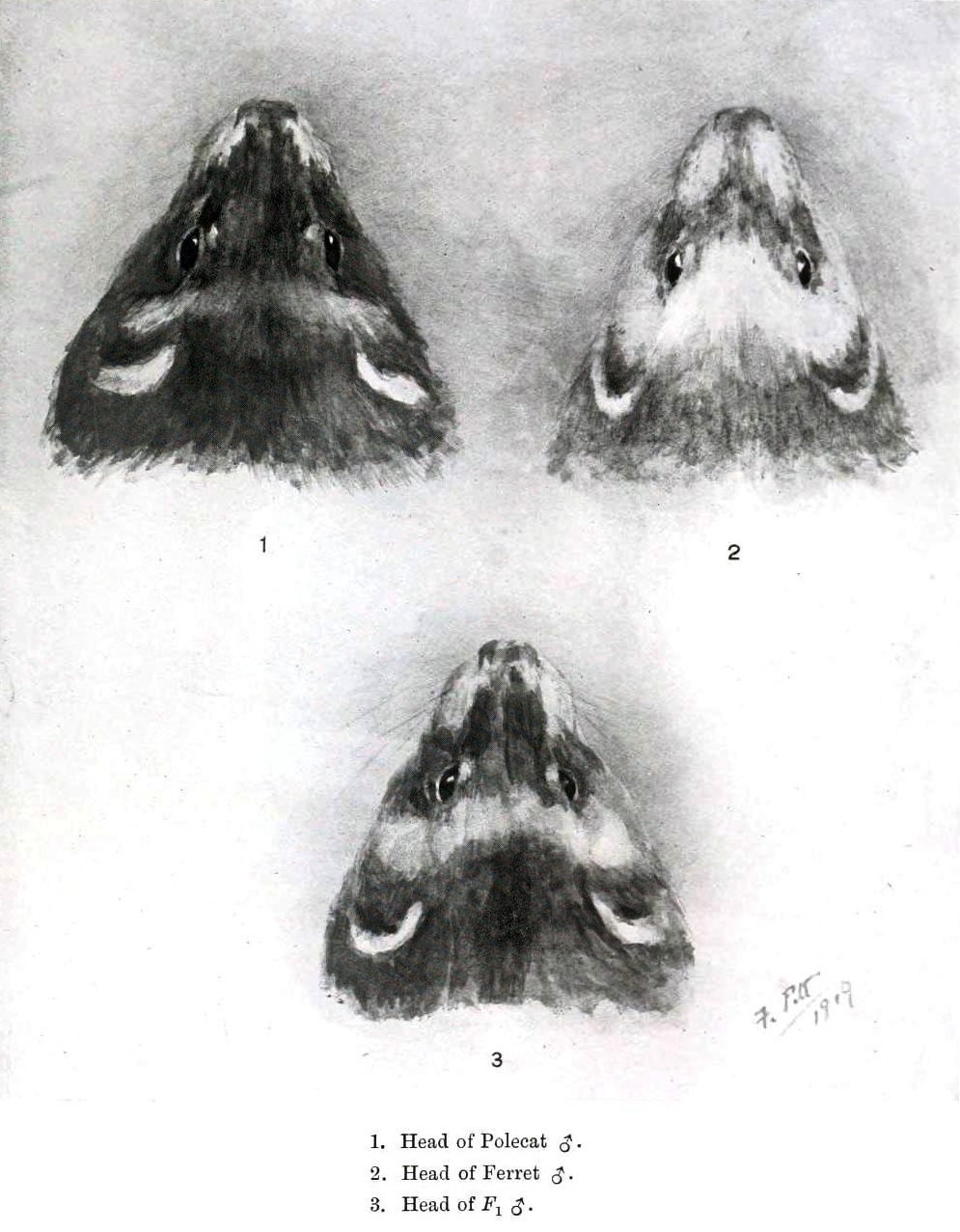
Heads of a 1) polecat, 2) ferret and 3) polecat-ferret hybrid

In some parts of Britain, the abandonment of domestic ferrets has led to ferret-polecat crossbreeds living in the wild. Ferrets were likely first brought to Britain after the Norman Conquest of England, or as late as the fourteenth century. Crossbreeds between the two animals typically have a distinct white throat patch, white feet and white hairs interspersed among the fur. Typically, first generation crossbreeds between polecats and ferrets develop their wild parents' fear of humans if left with their mothers during the critical socialisation period between 7½ and 8½ weeks of age.

The European polecat can hybridise with the European mink, producing offspring termed khor'-tumak by Russian furriers and khonorik by fanciers. Such hybridisation is very rare in the wild, and typically only occurs where the European mink population is in decline. A polecat-mink hybrid has a poorly defined facial mask, yellow fur on the ears, grey-yellow underfur and long, dark brown guard hairs. It is fairly large, with a male attaining the peak sizes known for European polecats weighing 1,120–1,746 g (2 lb 7 1/2 oz – 3 lb 13 9/16 oz) and measuring 41–47 cm (16–18 1/2 in) in length; a female is much larger than a female European minks weighing 742 g (26 3/16 oz) and measuring 37 cm (14 1/2 in) in length. The majority of polecat-mink hybrids have skulls bearing greater similarities to those of polecats than to minks; they can swim well and burrow for food like polecats, but are difficult to tame and breed, as males are sterile. The first captive polecat-mink hybrid was created in 1978 for fur, but breeding of these hybrids declined as European mink populations decreased. Studies on the behavioural ecology of free-ranging polecat-mink hybrids in the upper reaches of the Lovat River indicate that hybrids stray from aquatic habitats more readily than minks, and tolerate both parent species entering their territories, though the hybrid's larger size, especially the male's deters intrusion. During summer, the diets of wild polecat-mink hybrids are more similar to those of minks than to the polecats, as they feed predominantly on frogs. During winter, their diets overlap more with those of polecats, and will eat a larger proportion of rodents than in the summer, though they still rely heavily on frogs and rarely scavenge ungulate carcasses as polecats do.

The European polecat can also hybridise with the Asian steppe polecat or the domestic ferret to produce fertile offspring. European-steppe polecat hybrids are very rare, despite their sympatry in several areas. Nevertheless, hybrids have been recorded in southern Ukraine, the Kursk and Voronezh Oblasts, the Trans-Carpathians and several other localities.

== Range, history and conservation ==
The European polecat is widespread in the western Palaearctic to the Urals in the Russian Federation, though it is absent from Ireland, northern Scandinavia, and much of the Balkans and eastern Adriatic coast. It occurs only marginally in northern Greece. It is found in Morocco in the Rif Mountains, from sea level to 2,400 m (7,900 ft). Its domesticated form, the ferret, was introduced in Britain, and some Mediterranean islands and New Zealand.

=== Britain ===
There are ... some extreme examples, but the fact remains that throughout England and Wales polecats were consistently persecuted at a greater intensity than any other species of mustelid. Did this level of persecution have an effect on overall numbers or did it purely satisfy local vengeance? ... The polecat may be the best example of a species for which the level of killing really did make a difference to the population. The developing sporting estates then administered the coup de grâce.

— Roger Lovegrove (2007)

In Britain, the European polecat was regarded as a serious poultry predator prior to the introduction of wire netting, therefore eliminating it was considered the only option to protect stock. This extreme enmity does not appear to have been universal however. Speaking of Merioneth (Gwynedd) Peter Hope Jones reported that "for a county supposedly well-placed within the known past distribution of this species, Merioneth has relatively very few records of Polecats amongst its parish bounty payments. Perhaps this animal was not generally considered to be an important pest, but whatever the real reason, in only two parishes are direct references made to this species by the name by which we know it today. In the years from 1729 to 1732 about twenty were killed in Towyn parish, where 2/6 was paid for a full-grown polecat and half this sum for a young 'kittin'. Records for Llanfor.... show that only 42 were killed in the 39-year period from 1720 to 1758, the payment being exactly half the going rate for a fox, i.e. 2/6 for a full-grown polecat, and 1/3 for a young animal".

In Kent, for example, at least 42 parishes paid bounties for polecats, of which three extended into the 19th century, though by this time only single individuals were recorded, and usually after gaps of many years. In the Kingdom of Scotland, during the reign of David II, an export duty of 4d. was imposed on each polecat fur trimmer, which was raised to 8d. in 1424. The species held an important place in Scotland's fur markets; the annual Dumfries Fur Fair (1816–1874) sold 400 polecat pelts in 1829 and 600 in 1831. The following year, a contemporary account described polecat skins as "a drug on the market". In 1856, the number of sold pelts decreased to 240, 168 in 1860, 12 in 1866 and none in 1869. The decline was halted with the decrease in the intensity of gamekeeping during the 20 year interval between the First and Second World Wars.

The European polecat is afforded both national and European protection; it is listed on Schedule 6 of the Wildlife and Countryside Act 1981 and Regulation 41 of the Conservation (Natural Habitats, &c.) Regulations 1994 and is listed on Annex V of the Habitats Directive. A survey carried out by the Vincent Wildlife Trust in 2015 found that the polecat had spread into areas (such as East Anglia and South Yorkshire) where they had not been seen for 100 years. Naturalist Chris Packham termed the spread "...one of the great natural recoveries."

The New Forest in Hampshire also now has a small polecat population, a fact discovered after scientists set up cameras to film pine martens.

=== France ===
The European polecat is present in all of France's territories, excepting Corsica, and has been in a state of decline for several decades. Nevertheless, it is listed as Least Concern on France's Red Data Book. The European polecat is rare in numerous regions or départements. In the Rhone-Alps region, its population has undergone a sizeable decline since the 1990s, largely as a consequence of poisoning campaigns against muskrats. A 1999 study on the decline of polecats in this region indicated the species has little chance of surviving there. Elsewhere, it is considered either rare or sporadic in 22 districts and absent or extirpated in 22 others. In Drôme, for example, polecat populations have been decreasing since 1975, and have disappeared in 27 communes in Isère. Its numbers are declining in Morvan and Ariège, and is thinly distributed in Brittany. Although present in Aquitaine, its numbers have been dropping since the 1950s, and is very rare in the mountain regions. In Normandy, the speed of the polecat's decline has somewhat decreased. In the alpine départements, its range is limited by altitude, as the species relies on more Mediterranean climates to thrive. It is, however, especially abundant in the irrigated Crau, but is absent on the eastern part of the area, apparently being restricted by the valleys of the Durance and Rhone Rivers. The largest populations occur in Northern France: Pas de Calais, Central France; Alsace, Lorraine and the areas of the Loire with the Vendée, which holds the largest record of polecat observations. It is common in all the départements of Champagne-Ardenne.

=== Former Soviet Union ===
The western border of the European polecat's range in the former Soviet Union begins from the mouth of the Danube in the south approximately to northwest of Suoyarvi, on the Finnish border in the north. In Karelia, its northern border extends from the former point towards the southeast to the Spassk Bay of Lake Onega, thereby passing around the West Karelian uplands from the south and then, passing around these uplands from the east, it suddenly ascends directly to the north passing in particular, near the western shore of Segozer and reaches Rugozer. From there, the border line turns northeast, crossing the Lakhta and reaching Kem on the White Sea. From Arkhangelsk, the border reaches Mezen, thus attaining the species' most northerly range. From the Mezen River's mouth, the border abruptly returns south, approaching closer to the upper Mezen near 64° lat. From there, the polecat's northern border goes on to the upper Vychegda River, and descends further on southwards and in the Urals. Its eastern range apparently extends along the Urals, embracing Sverdlovsk from the west. It is probably absent in the southern Urals, where the steppe polecat occurs. The southern border of the polecat's range starts in the west of the Danube's mouth and extends eastward along the coast of the Black Sea reaching the mouth of the Dnepr, from which it moves back from the shore of the Azov Sea and, along it, goes to the mouth of the Don. From the mouth and lower course of the Don, its range passes into the steppe region of western and middle Ciscaucasia. The European polecat is absent from the Saratov steppes of Transvolga, instead being encountered only in the extreme lower Bolshoy and Maly Irgiz Rivers. Further on, the border goes to the north along the Volga River. It steeply returns east somewhat south at the Samara bend, passing around Obshchy Syrt, reaching the Urals at the latitude of Magnitogorsk. The range of the polecat within the former Soviet Union has expanded northwards. From 1930 to 1952 for example, the polecat colonised northwestern Karelia and southern Finland.

Prior to the First World War, the Russian Empire produced more than 50% of global polecat skins. The harvesting of polecats in Russia increased substantially after the October Revolution, which coincided with Western Europe's decline in polecat numbers. The Russian population of polecats decreased somewhat after the Second World War, and their hunting was subsequently discouraged, as polecats were acknowledged to limit harmful rodent populations.

== Diseases and parasites ==
The European polecat may suffer from distemper, influenza, the common cold and pneumonia. Occasionally, it is affected by malignant tumours and hydrocephaly. It commonly has broken teeth and, on rarer occasions, fatal abscesses on the jaw, head and neck. In mainland Europe, it is a carrier of trichinosis, leptospirosis, toxoplasmosis and adiaspiromycosis. Incidences of polecats carrying rabies are high in some localized areas.

Ectoparasites known to infest polecats include flea species such as Ctenocephalides felis, Archaeospylla erinacei, Nosopsyllus fasciatus and Paraceras melis. The tick Ixodes hexagonus is the polecat's most common ectoparasite, which is sometimes found in large numbers on the neck and behind the ears. Another, less common species to infest polecats is I. canisuga. The biting louse Trichodectes jacobi is also known to infest polecats.

Endoparasites carried by polecats include the cestodes Taenia tenuicollis and T. martis and the nematodes Molineus patens, Strongyloides papillosus, Capilliaria putorii, Filaroides martis and Skjrabingylus nasicola.

== Relationships with humans ==
=== Hunting and fur use ===
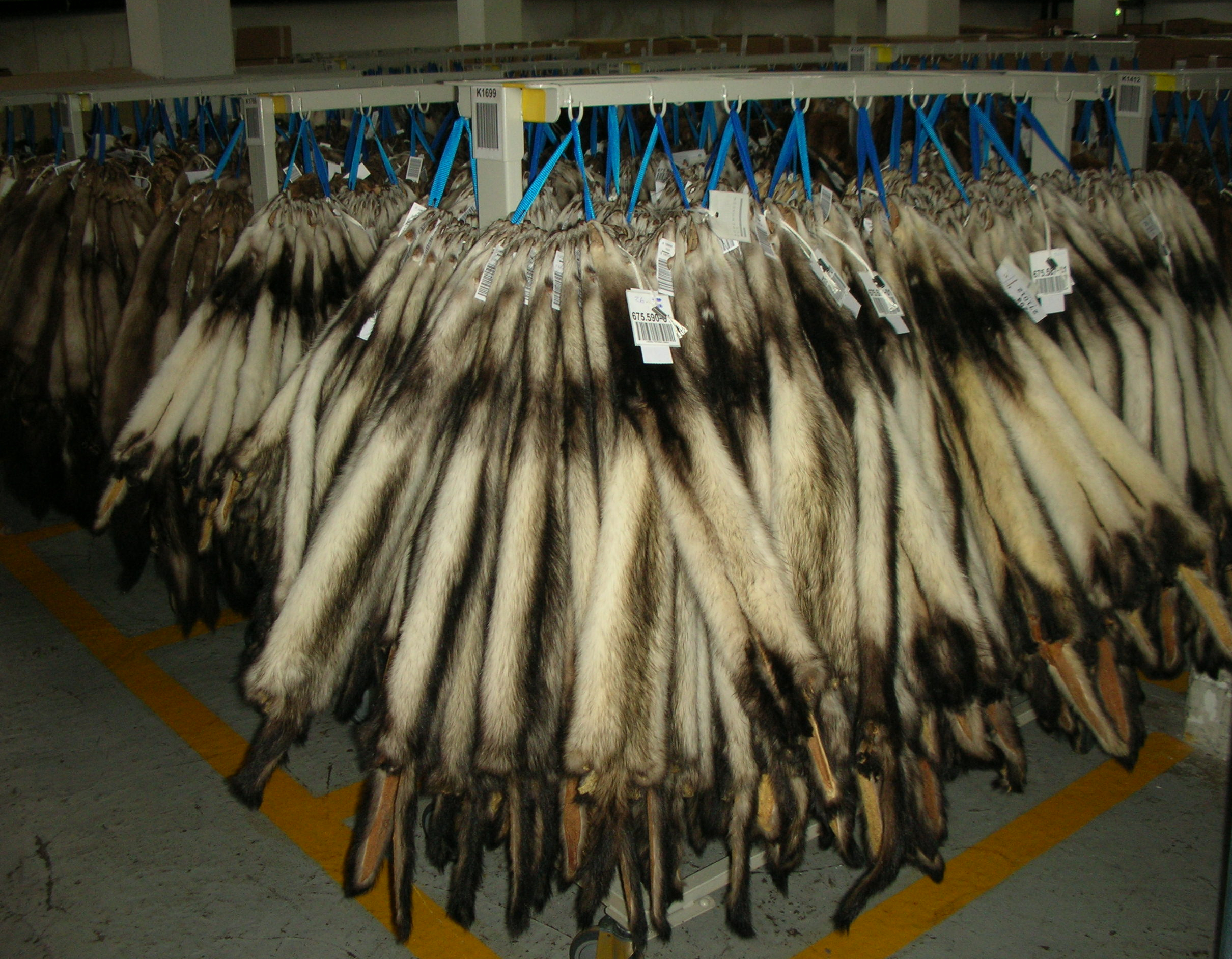
Polecat skins (fitch) in Copenhagen

The polecat has earned for itself a most unenviable fame, having been long celebrated as one of the most noxious pests to which the farmyard is liable. Slightly smaller than the marten, and not quite so powerful, it is found to be a more deadly enemy to rabbits, game and poultry, than any other animal its size.

— John George Wood

European polecat hunting was once a favourite sport of the Westmorland dalesmen and the Scots, who hunted them at night in midwinter. However, the majority of polecat deaths caused by humans have been accidental, having mostly been caused by steel traps set for rabbits. Hunting polecats by moonlight was also a popular diversion among midland schoolboys. Until the mid-19th century, polecats in Britain were hunted from early February to late April with mixed packs of hunting dogs on the Welsh hills and Lakeland fells, though otterhounds were used on the fells, the Border country and the Scottish Lowlands. John Tucker Edwardes, the creator of the Sealyham Terrier, used captured wild male polecats to test the gameness of yearling terriers. In the former Soviet Union, polecats are hunted chiefly in late autumn and early winter with guns and hunting dogs, as well as foothold traps and wooden snares. However, even in season, hunters rarely catch more than 10–15 polecats. The species does not constitute an important element in former Soviet commercial hunting, and is usually only caught incidentally.

The European polecat is a valuable fur bearer, whose pelt (fitch) is more valuable than the steppe polecat's. Its skin is used primarily in the production of jackets, capes and coats. It is particularly well suited for trimmings for women's clothing. The tail is sometimes used for the making of paintbrushes. One disadvantage of polecat skin, however, is its unpleasant odour, which is difficult to remove. The European polecat was first commercially farmed for its fur in Great Britain during the 1920s, but was only elevated to economic importance in Finland in 1979. It never became popular in the United States and Canada, due to import laws regarding non-native species. It did gain economic importance in the USSR, though.

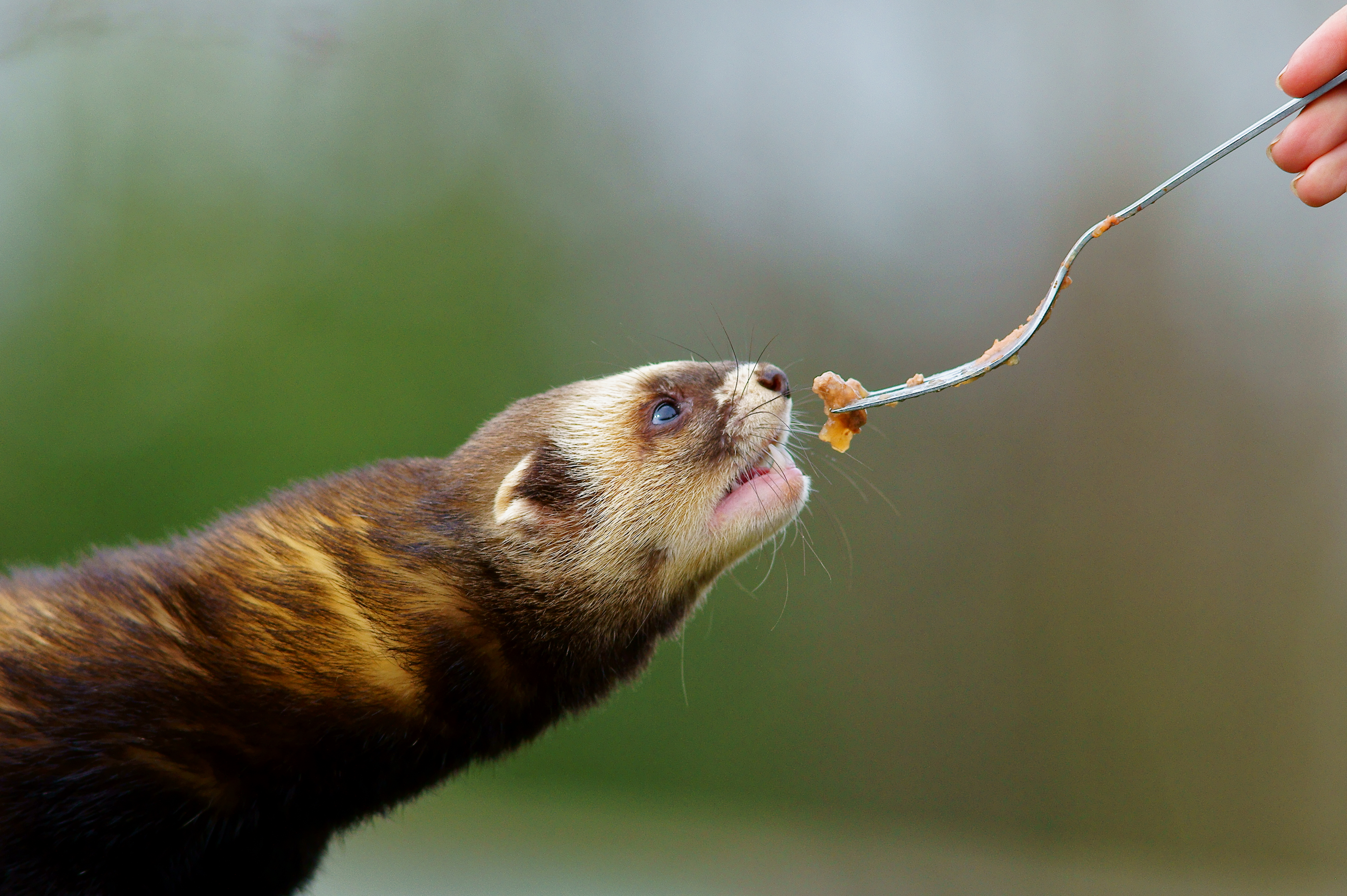
Welsh polecat being fed at the British Wildlife Centre, Newchapel, Surrey

=== Tameability ===
Unlike the stoat and least weasel, the European polecat is easy to breed in captivity. According to Aubyn Trevor-Battye, the European polecat is difficult to tame, but is superior to its domesticated form, the ferret, in bolting rats from their holes due to its greater agility. It is prone to attempting escape once finished bolting rats, but can be easily outrun. Polecat kits can be successfully raised and suckled by mother cats. According to Owen's Welsh Dictionary, the Gwythelians (early Irish settlers in northern Wales) kept polecats as pets. Attempts to tame the European polecat are generally hampered by the adult's nervous and unsociable disposition. First generation hybrids between polecats and ferrets, conceived to improve the latter's bloodlines, produce animals with personalities similar to their wild parent's.

=== In culture ===
In Britain, the polecat historically has had a negative reputation. References to the polecat in early English literature are often vilifying, usually being synonymous with prostitutes and generally immoral people, as is the case in Shakespeare's The Merry Wives of Windsor: "Out of my door, you witch, you hag, you baggage, you polecat, you runyon!" In some rural areas, the belief persists that the polecat chews off the ears of sleeping sheep and can paralyse or kill men by jumping on them from behind and biting their necks. However, in some regions, it was widely believed among farmers that allowing a polecat to nest in a chicken coop would ensure the animal would not kill the poultry out of gratitude, and instead kill vermin. Cases in which polecats did kill poultry were attributed to animals which were guests at other farms. In Wales, polecats were widely believed to migrate in large numbers every spring to the great peat bog of Tregaron to feed on the breeding frogs there. This was later proven to be incorrect, as the climate in Tregaron is too wet for the European polecat, and it does not hold large frog populations. Compared to other British carnivores, such as otters and badgers, the polecat has received little exposure in popular media. A study conducted on rural school children showed only 3.8% of the surveyed children could identify polecats in photographs, whereas 83.7% correctly identified otters.

== Gallery ==
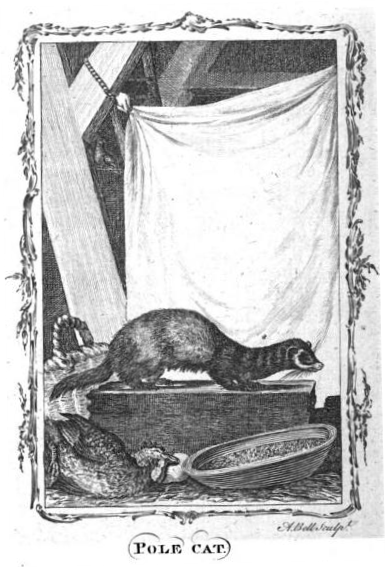
Buffon's illustration of a polecat in volume 4 of Natural history, general and particular

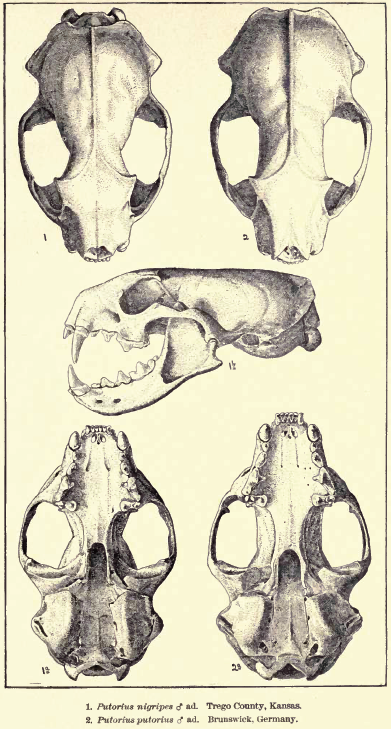
Skulls of a black-footed ferret (1) and European polecat (2), as illustrated in Merriam's Synopsis of the Weasels of North America

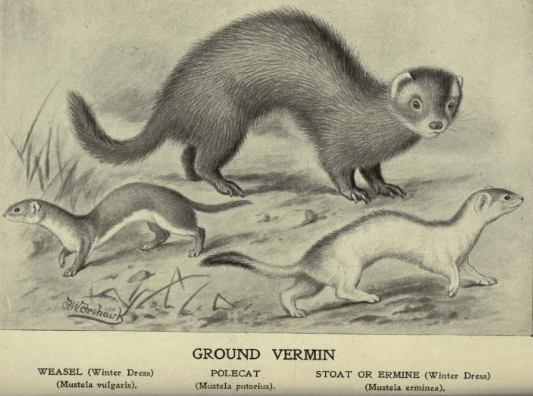
Comparative illustration of a European polecat, least weasel and stoat, as illustrated in Carnegie's Practical Game-preserving

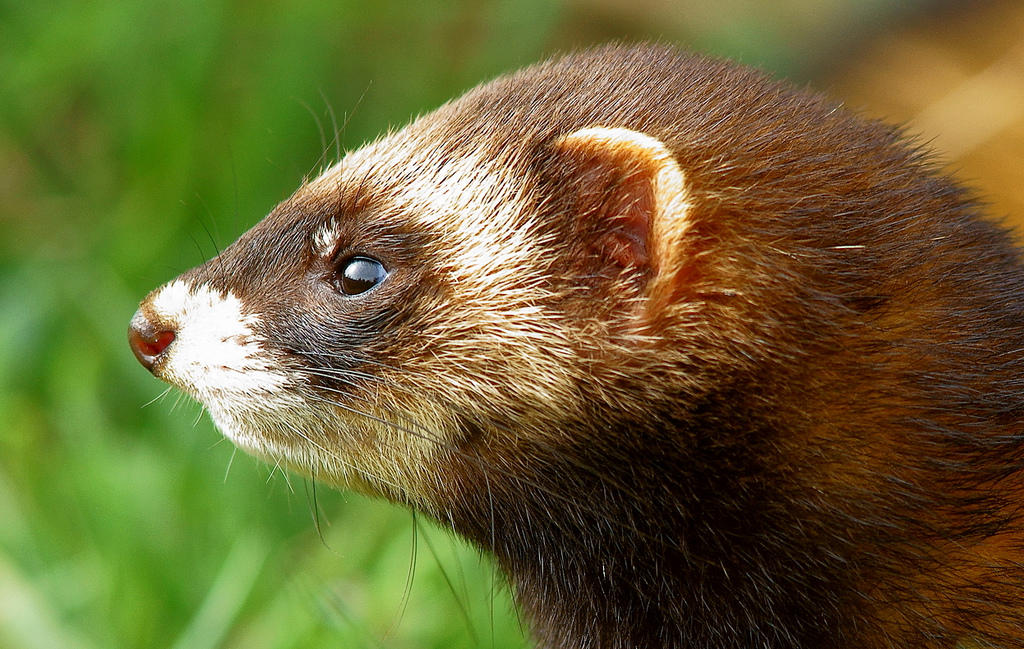
Welsh polecat profile

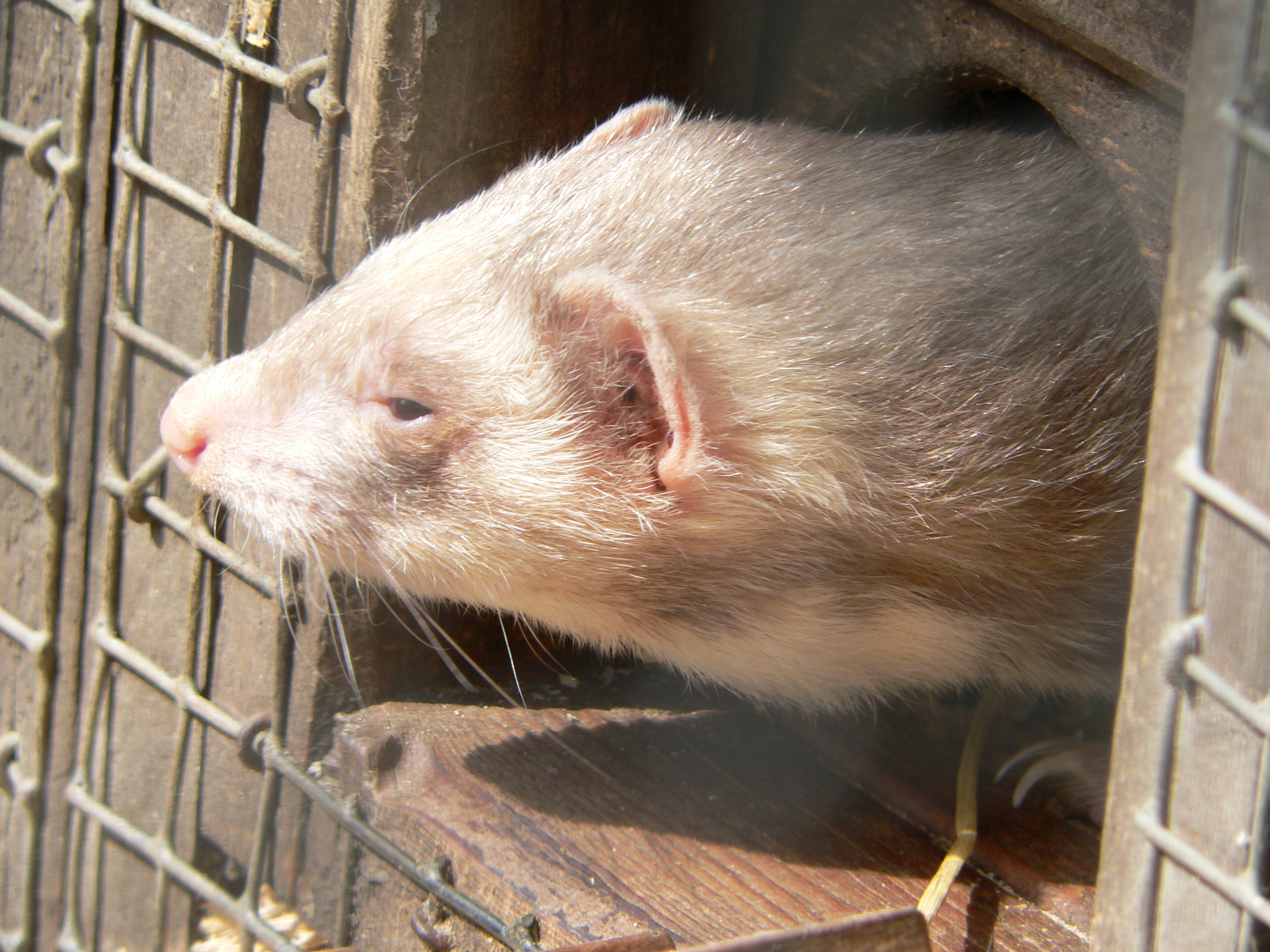
A light-coloured (amelanistic) morph
