= Vincent Wildlife Trust =

Charity in the UK and Ireland

- Conserving threatened mammals
- Abbreviation: VWT
- Formation: 1975
- Legal status: Non-profit company and registered charity
- Purpose: Conservation of mammals in Britain and Ireland.
- Location: 3-4 Bronsil Courtyard, Eastnor, Ledbury, Herefordshire, HR8 1EP
- Region served: Britain, Ireland and mainland Europe
- Chief Executive Officer: Lucy Rogers
- Website: Official website

Vincent Wildlife Trust (VWT) was founded in 1975 by the Honourable Vincent Weir (1935-2014). It is a charity that focuses on mammal conservation in Britain, Ireland and mainland Europe. Its Head Office is in Herefordshire.

== Background ==
Vincent Weir was the younger son of Andrew Weir, second Baron Inverforth. He was educated at Malvern College and on leaving school, Vincent joined the family firm, the Andrew Weir Group.

In 1975, Vincent established Vincent Wildlife Trust to focus initially on the status of the otter. Other species the Trust has been or is involved with include the water vole, dormouse, stoat, weasel, polecat, pine marten and the rarer species of bats in Britain, notably the horseshoe bats, Bechstein's bat and barbastelle and in Ireland, the lesser horseshoe bat.

== Today ==
Vincent Wildlife Trust's Vision is that the Trust is a catalyst for mammal conservation. Its Mission is to conserve threatened mammals by leading the way with scientifically sound conservation work.

Survey and monitoring, research, education, training and advocacy together represent the current work of VWT. Read its Ten-Year Strategy, which underpins the current direction of VWT’s work.

== Mammal conservation work ==
=== European otter (Lutra lutra) ===
National otter surveys of England, Scotland and Wales began in 1977, with the VWT covering Scotland. In the 1980s, VWT again surveyed Scotland and also Wales and Ireland. In the early 1990s, the VWT also took over the surveying of England. The surveys relied on searching for otter spraints. The surveys recorded a level of recovery in Britain's otter population between the first round of surveys in the late 1970s and the third round in the early 1990s.

=== European water vole (Arvicola amphibius) ===
The Trust carried out the first and second national water vole surveys in 1989-1990 and 1996–98. These surveys identified the crash in the water vole population in Britain. Following the publication of the first survey, the water vole was given a degree of legal protection in 1998 under the 1981 Wildlife and Countryside Act. In 2008, a greater level of protection was given in England and Wales. The long-term decline of the water vole resulted from a loss of habitat and changes in farming practices, but the acceleration in the rate of this decline in the 1980s was down to increasing predation by feral American mink. The status of the water vole is now monitored annually by the PTES through the National Water Vole Monitoring programme and is based on those sites originally surveyed by the trust.

=== Horseshoe bats (Rhinolophus ferrumequinum and Rhinolophus hipposideros) ===
The Trust became involved in bat conservation in Britain and Ireland in the 1980s, providing information and advice and helping to set up the network of county Bat Groups that still exists today. In 1980, the Trust purchased a farm building in Devon that is now home to the largest known maternity colony of greater horseshoe bats in western Europe. Roost acquisition continued over a period of more than 25 years. Today, the Trust still manages 36 horseshoe bat roosts in Britain and Ireland and this also includes, in Wales, the largest known maternity colony of lesser horseshoe bats in western Europe. Much of the Trust's bat research has focused on the lesser horseshoe bat, including a number of radio-tracking studies. Population studies include detailed surveys of the lesser horseshoe bat in Ireland. In 2008, the Trust published The Lesser Horseshoe Bat Conservation Handbook, a practical guide to the management of lesser horseshoe bat roosts.

In 2021, following the discovery of a small colony of breeding greater horseshoe bats in a derelict stable in West Sussex —the first record in 100 years in southeast England, Vincent Wildlife Trust launched an appeal in partnership with Sussex Bat Group to raise funds to buy the building and to turn it into a suitable maternity roost for this rare species. The appeal was successful and the bats have a chance to once again thrive in part of their former ranges.

VWT's Horseshoes Heading East, a partnership project with funding from Natural England's Species Recovery programme, aims to create a viable population of greater horseshoe bats in southeast England through a combination of roost creation and habitat enhancement. Improving connectivity across the landscape and linking maternity sites to improve the breeding success of this rare and iconic species. The project will also support other rare bat species such as the greater mouse-eared bat and the grey long-eared bat.

In Ireland, VWT Ireland's Lesser Horseshoe Bat Conservation Project was an EIP (European Innovation Partnership) project that was administered by Mulcair Catchment Ltd and funded by the EU Recovery Instrument Funding under the Rural Development Programme 2014-2022. The project has provided new and permanent summer roosting sites for the species in lowland locations within the Mulkear River Catchment and raised awareness of the important role that farmers play in its conservation. The new roosts are located on farms within a few kilometres of waterways or woodlands that will, in time, increase the chances of this species being able to connect with colonies in other areas of Limerick and reduce the risk of inbreeding.

VWT Ireland has also carried out a modelling study funded by National Parks and Wildlife Service during 2020 to investigate gaps in the distribution of the lesser horseshoe bat in Ireland over its entire range. The study incorporates datasets on land cover, roads, linear habitat features and density of artificial lighting to produce a baseline map of potential ecological corridors to connect lesser horseshoe bat sub-populations.

=== European polecat (Mustela putorius) ===
The European polecat population in Britain declined following widespread predator control, particularly in the late 19th century. Today, it has recolonised much of its former range. In order to gauge the extent of this range expansion, the Trust has carried out three national polecat distribution surveys since the 1990s. The fourth national polecat survey was launched at the beginning of January 2024. The Trust has carried out research to further understanding of the ecology of the polecat, including live trapping, radio-tracking, investigation of secondary rodenticide poisoning, and genetic analysis of hybridisation between polecats and ferrets.

=== European pine marten (Martes martes) ===
By the early part of the 20th century, the pine marten in Britain was confined to the Northwest Highlands of Scotland and isolated pockets of the uplands of northern England and Wales. The Trust has been researching and surveying Britain's pine marten population for 30 years, monitoring the population and developing survey methods, including the use of DNA analysis.

In 2015, the Trust's Pine Marten Recovery Project began the translocation of pine martens from Scotland to mid Wales. Twenty martens were translocated in the autumn of 2015 and their progress monitored through an intensive radio-tracking programme. Further translocations took place in 2016 and 2017 bringing the total to just over 50 animals. These animals continue to be monitored using radio tracking, remote cameras and volunteers collecting scats.

Between 2017 and 2020, VWT ran a pine marten project, as part of the national Back from the Brink project. This project monitored and paved the way for the recovery of the pine marten in northern England as the population spreads south from Scotland.

In 2016, VWT began working with Gloucestershire Wildlife Trust and Forestry England to reintroduce pine martens to the Forest of Dean and the Wye Valley in Gloucestershire. A total of 35 pine martens were translocated from Scotland to the Forest of Dean between 2019 and 2021.

Between May 2022 and May 2023, VWT carried out the Development Phase of National Lottery Heritage Fund project – Martens on the Move, which was granted funding for a four-year project to work with local communities to help the long-term survival of pine martens and to ensure gene flow between the new populations, and their expansion across the counties. This has been made possible thanks to the Players of the National Lottery.

=== Irish stoat (Mustela erminea hibernica) ===
The Irish sub-species of stoat occurs all over Ireland and the Isle of Man and occur in most habitats with sufficient cover, including urban areas, for example rat-infested rubbish dumps. However, studies have shown that they occur most often in wooded areas, and readily climb trees. VWT Ireland launched a two-year Irish Stoat Citizen Science Surveyin February 2023, which calls for sightings of the native mammal. It is the first systematic survey of the Irish stoat throughout the island of Ireland. The survey was created in partnership with the National Biodiversity Data Centre, the Centre for Environmental Data and Recording in Northern Ireland and University of Galway.
