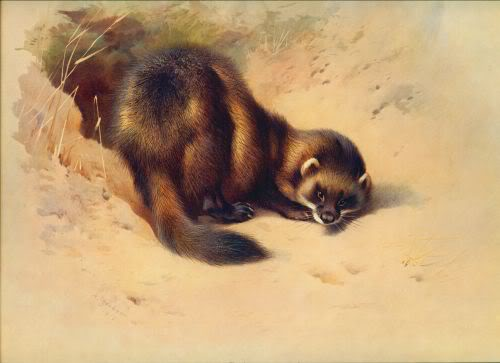
- Painting by Archibald Thorburn

Conservation status
- Extinct (c. 1912)

Scientific classification
- Kingdom: Animalia
- Phylum: Chordata
- Class: Mammalia
- Order: Carnivora
- Family: Mustelidae
- Genus: Mustela
- Species: M. putorius
- Subspecies: †M. p. caledoniae

Trinomial name
- †Mustela putorius caledoniae (Tetley, 1939)

Synonyms
- Putorius putorius caledoniae Tetley, 1939

= Scottish polecat =

Subspecies of mustelid

The Scottish polecat (Mustela putorius caledoniae) is an extinct subspecies of European polecat that was endemic to Scotland until its extinction in the early 20th century. It was one of two subspecies of polecat in the island of Great Britain. In Scotland, polecats are referred as "foumarts", a term which originates from the Scots language.

The Scottish polecat was first described in 1939 after its extinction. Its range before its extinction was a far northern portion of Scotland.

== Etymology and terms ==
The native term for polecat in Scotland is "foumart". This term originates from a Scots term with multiple spellings, such as fuimart or fumart. In Robert Burns' dialect of Ayrshire, the native term was thummurt or thoomart. This word is a contraction of the words "foul marten", as a reference to the odour of the polecat.

== Taxonomy ==
The Scottish polecat was first described by H. Tetley in 1939, after its extinction. Tetley suggests that the domestic ferret's progenitor was a Sutherland population of Scottish polecat. Polecats first arrived in Britain from continental Europe at the end of the Last Glacial Period around 9,500 years ago.

== Distribution and range ==
The Scottish polecat was one of two polecat subspecies in the island of Great Britain, the other being the Welsh polecat. Despite being extinct in other parts of Scotland, by 1881 Scottish polecat populations had managed to survive in the far north, above the Moray Firth. The Scottish polecat was once common in all Scottish mainland counties before its decline.

== Description ==
According to Scottish artist Archibald Thorburn, the Scottish polecat's length of head and body measures around 18 in (46 cm). Its tail measures 7–8 in (18–20 cm). The Scottish polecat's underfur was of a light yellowish shade of buff, which blended with the dark brown/black colour of its outerfur. It was smaller and more muscular than the pine marten, a fellow mustelid.

== Extinction and claimed post-extinction sightings ==
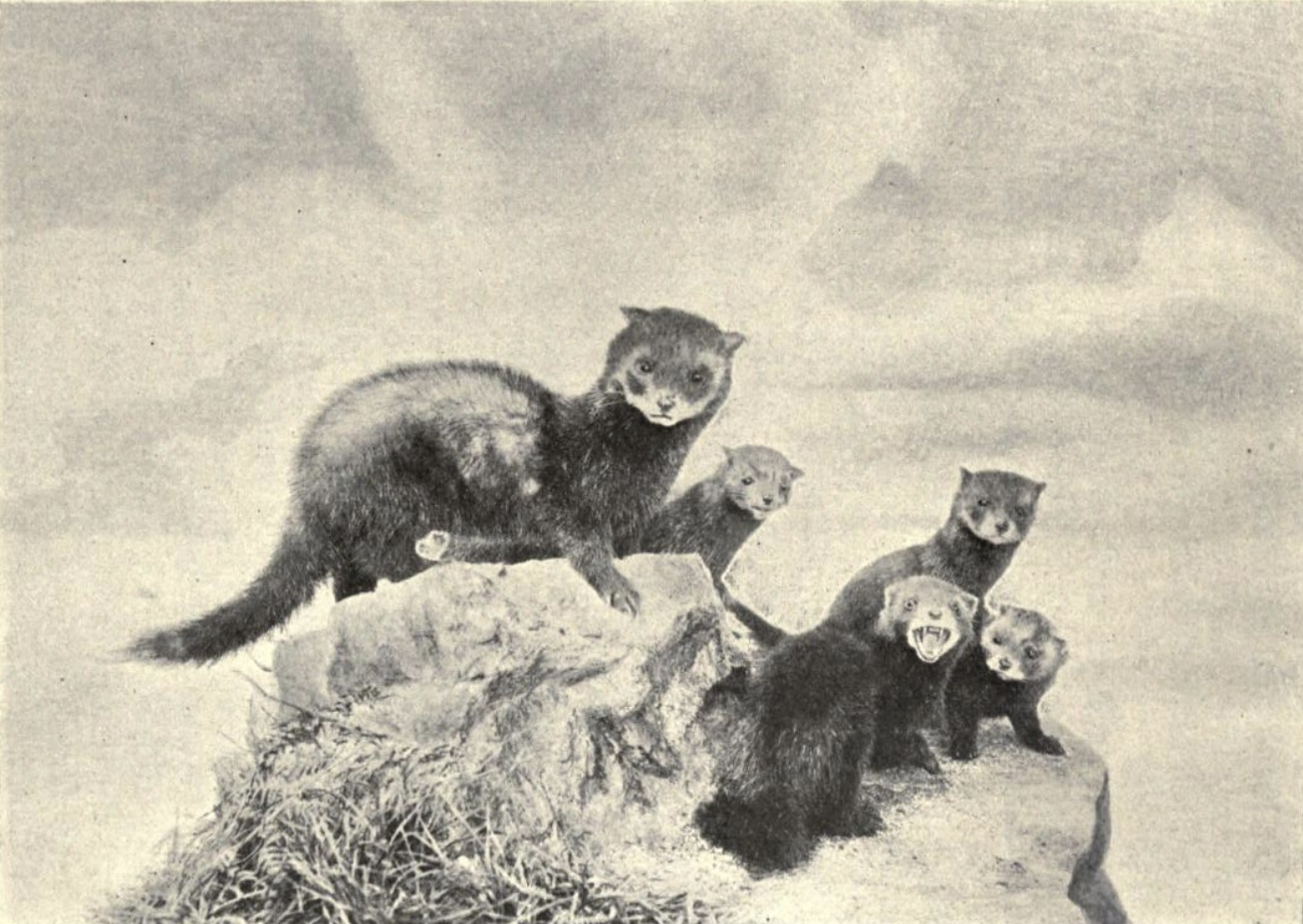
A Scottish polecat family

Polecat populations decreased in the 20th century because of persecution. The last Scottish polecat sighting comes from 1912 in the small town of Lairg, Sutherland.

Many have reported seeing polecats in Scotland after the Scottish polecat's extinction. The earliest known sighting post-extinction was from H.M. Batten, who reported seeing one in Ardnamurchan. P.J.W. Langley and D.W. Walden believe this animal was actually a polecat–ferret hybrid from the Isle of Mull, which has a large polecat–ferret population. In 1987, polecats who resemble Welsh polecats were mostly found as road casualties in Scotland. These polecats were either Scottish polecats, escaped Welsh polecats or dark-furred feral ferrets.
