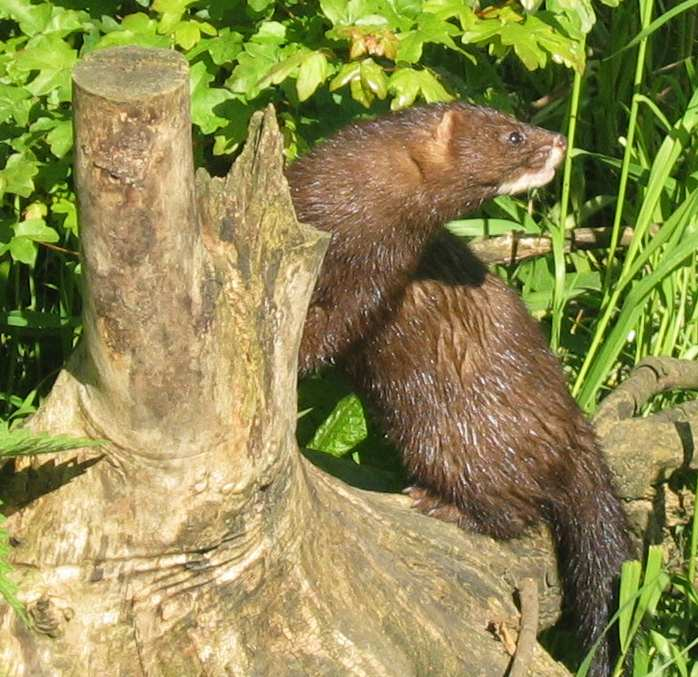

Conservation status
- Critically Endangered (IUCN 3.1)

Scientific classification
- Kingdom: Animalia
- Phylum: Chordata
- Class: Mammalia
- Order: Carnivora
- Family: Mustelidae
- Genus: Mustela
- Species: M. lutreola

Binomial name
- Mustela lutreola (Linnaeus, 1761)
- European mink range Extant, resident Probably Extant, resident Extinct

= European mink =

Species of mammal

The European mink (Mustela lutreola), also known as the Russian mink and Eurasian mink, is a semiaquatic species of mustelid native to Europe.

It is similar in colour to the American mink, but is slightly smaller and has a less specialized skull. Despite having a similar name, build and behaviour, the European mink is not closely related to the American mink, being much closer to the European polecat and Siberian weasel (kolonok). The European mink occurs primarily by forest streams unlikely to freeze in winter. It primarily feeds on voles, frogs, fish, crustaceans and insects.

The European mink is listed by the IUCN as Critically Endangered due to an ongoing reduction in numbers, having been calculated as declining more than 50% over the past three generations and expected to decline at a rate exceeding 80% over the next three generations. European mink numbers began to shrink during the 19th century, with the species rapidly becoming extinct in some parts of Central Europe. During the 20th century, mink numbers declined all throughout their range, the reasons for which having been hypothesised to be due to a combination of factors, including climate change, competition with (as well as diseases spread by) the introduced American mink, habitat destruction, declines in crayfish numbers and hybridisation with the European polecat. In Central Europe and Finland, the decline preceded the introduction of the American mink, having likely been due to the destruction of river ecosystems, while in Estonia, the decline seems to coincide with the spread of the American mink.

== Evolution and taxonomy ==
Fossil finds of the European mink are very rare, thus indicating the species is either a relative newcomer to Europe, probably having originated in North America, or a recent speciation caused by hybridization. It likely first arose in the Middle Pleistocene, with several fossils in Europe dated to the Late Pleistocene being found in caves and some suggesting early exploitation by humans. Genetic analyses indicate, rather than being closely related to the American mink, the European mink's closest relative is the European polecat (perhaps due to past hybridization) and the Siberian weasel, being intermediate in form between true polecats and other members of the genus. The closeness between the mink and polecat is emphasized by the fact the species can hybridize.

=== Subspecies ===
As of 2005, seven subspecies are recognised.

Subspecies	Trinomial authority	Description	Range	Synonyms
Northern mink M. l. lutreola (Nominate subspecies)	Linnaeus, 1758	The pelt is dark brownish-chestnut or dark brown with a diffuse broad belt on the back. The tail tip is black and the underfur is dark bluish-grey. The overall pelage is long, compact and silky. Adult males measure 365–380 mm (14.4–15.0 in) in body length and have a tail length of 36–42 mm (1.4–1.7 in) (38% of its body length).	Northern European Russia and Finland	alba (de Sélys Longchamps, 1839) alpinus (Ogérien, 1863) europeae (Homeyer, 1879) fulva (Kerr, 1792) minor (Erxleben, 1777) wyborgensis (Barrett-Hamilton, 1904)
French mink M. l. biedermanni	Matschie, 1912		France	armorica (Matschie, 1912)
M. l. binominata	Ellerman and Morrison-Scott, 1951			caucasica (Novikov, 1939)
Middle European mink M. l. cylipena	Matschie, 1912	A very large subspecies, it is only slightly smaller than M. l. turovi. The fur is quite dark and corresponds to the colour of M. l. novikovi. Adult males measure 420–430 mm (17–17 in) in length, while females measure 370–400 mm (15–16 in). Tail length in males is 160 mm (6.3 in), while in females it is 140–180 mm (5.5–7.1 in).	The Kaliningrad Oblast, Lithuania, western Latvia, middle Europe (except the extreme west (France), Hungary, Romania, the former Yugoslavia and Poland)	albica (Matschie, 1912) budina (Matschie, 1912) glogeri (Matschie, 1912) varina (Matschie, 1912)
Middle Russian mink M. l. novikovi	Ellerman and Morrison-Scott, 1951	A moderately-sized subspecies, it is slightly larger than M. l. lutreola. It is lighter-coloured than M. l. lutreola, being dark tawny or dark brown with a film of light reddish highlights. The dark belt on the back is weakly defined or absent. The pelage is overall shorter, less dense and less silky than M. l. lutreola. Adult males measure 360–420 mm (14–17 in) in body length.	The middle zone of the European part of the former Soviet Union (Estonia, eastern Latvia, Belarus, eastern Ukraine, and the lower Don and lower Volga regions)	borealis (Novikov, 1939)
Carpathian mink Mustela l. transsylvanica	Éhik, 1932	Smaller than M. l. turovi, with dark tawny fur	Moldavia, Romania, Hungary, Bulgaria and the former Yugoslavia	ehiki (Kretzoi, 1942) hungarica (Éhik, 1932)
Caucasian mink M. l. turovi	Kuznetsov in Novikov, 1939	A large-sized subspecies, it has quite long, but sparse and coarse pelage and less compact underfur. The fur is light tawny or light brown with clear rusty highlights. The underfur is light bluish-grey. White chest markings are much more frequent in this subspecies than in others. The ends of the limbs are often white. Adult males usually measure more than 42 cm (17 in) long.	The Caucasus, the lower Don and lower Volga regions, probably eastern Ukraine	

== Description ==
=== Build ===
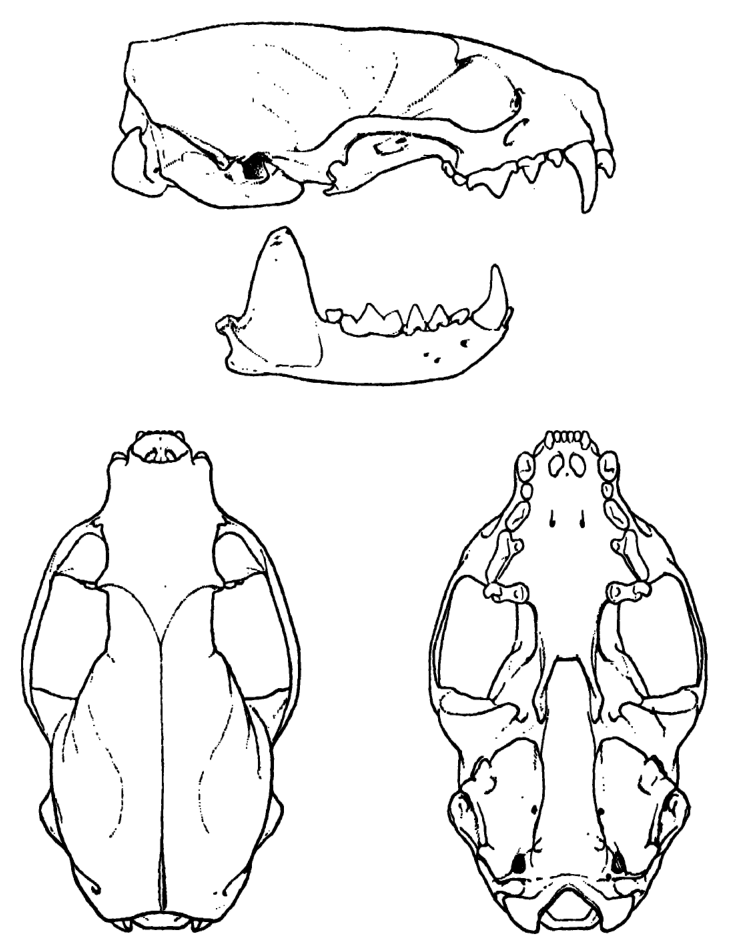
Skull, as illustrated by Gerrit Smith Miller Jr.

The European mink is a typical representative of the genus Mustela, having a greatly elongated body with short limbs. However, compared to its close relative, the Siberian weasel, the mink is more compact and less thinly built, thus approaching ferrets and European polecats in build. The European mink has a large, broad head with short ears. The limbs are short, with relatively well-developed membranes between the digits, particularly on the hind feet. The mink's tail is short, and does not exceed half the animal's body length (constituting about 40% of its length). The European mink's skull is less elongated than the kolonok's, with more widely spaced zygomatic arches and has a less massive facial region. In general characteristics, the skull is intermediate in shape between that of the Siberian weasel and the European polecat. Overall, the skull is less specialized for carnivory than that of polecats and the American mink. Males measure 373–430 mm (14.7–16.9 in) in body length, while females measure 352–400 mm (13.9–15.7 in). Tail length is 153–190 mm (6.0–7.5 in) in males and 150–180 mm (5.9–7.1 in). Overall weight is 550–800 grams (1.21–1.76 lb). It is a fast and agile animal, which swims and dives skilfully. It is able to run along stream beds, and stay underwater for one to two minutes. When swimming, it paddles with both its front and back limbs simultaneously.

=== Fur ===
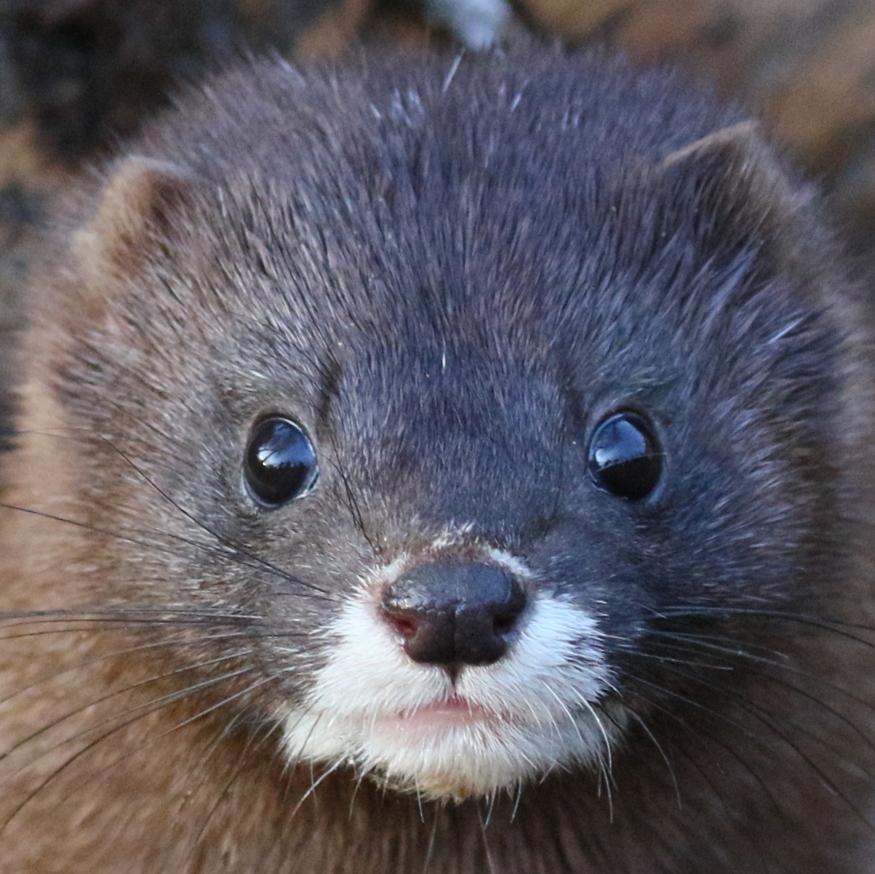
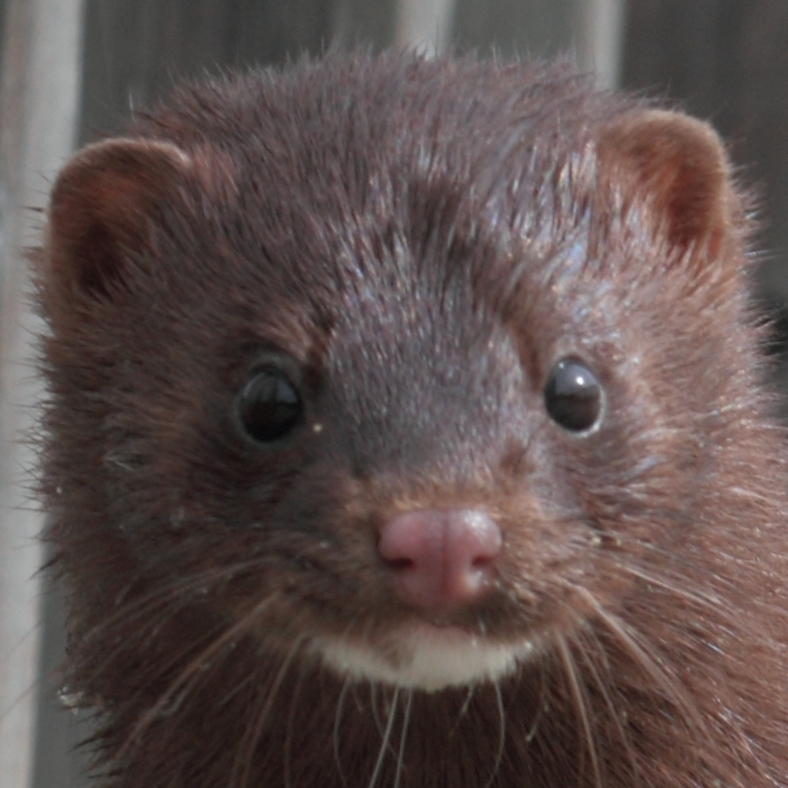
European mink (left) and American mink (right) faces. Note the white markings on the upper lip of the former, which are absent in the American species

The winter fur of the European mink is very thick and dense, but not long, and quite loosely fitting. The underfur is particularly dense compared with that of more land-based members of the genus Mustela. The guard hairs are quite coarse and lustrous, with very wide contour hairs which are flat in the middle, as is typical in aquatic mammals. The length of the hairs on the back and belly differ little, a further adaptation to the European mink's semiaquatic way of life. The summer fur is somewhat shorter, coarser and less dense than the winter fur, though the differences are much less than in purely terrestrial mustelids.

In dark coloured individuals, the fur is dark brown or almost blackish-brown, while light individuals are reddish brown. Fur colour is evenly distributed over the whole body, though in a few cases, the belly is a bit lighter than the upper parts. In particularly dark individuals, a dark, broad dorsal belt is present. The limbs and tail are slightly darker than the trunk. The face has no colour pattern, though its upper and lower lips and chin are pure white. White markings may also occur on the lower surface of the neck and chest. Occasionally, colour mutations such as albinos and white spots throughout the pelage occur. The summer fur is somewhat lighter, and dirty in tone, with more reddish highlights.

=== Differences from American mink ===
The European mink is similar to the American mink, but with several important differences. The tail is longer in the American species, almost reaching half its body length. The winter fur of the American mink is denser, longer and more closely fitting than that of the European mink. Unlike the European mink, which has white patches on both upper and lower lips, the American mink almost never has white marks on the upper lip. The European mink's skull is much less specialised than the American species' in the direction of carnivory, bearing more infantile features, such as a weaker dentition and less strongly developed projections. The European mink is reportedly less efficient than the American species underwater.

== Behaviour ==
=== Territorial and denning behaviours ===
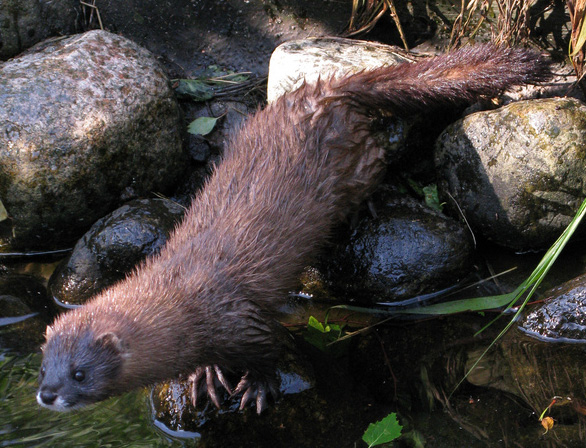
European mink by a pond

The European mink does not form large territories, possibly due to the abundance of food on the banks of small water bodies. The size of each territory varies according to the availability of food; in areas with water meadows with little food, the home range is 60–100 hectares (150–250 acres), though it is more usual for territories to be 12–14 hectares (30–35 acres). Summer territories are smaller than winter territories. Along shorelines, the length of a home range varies from 250–2,000 m (270–2,190 yd), with a width of 50–60 m (55–66 yd).

The European mink has both a permanent burrow and temporary shelters. The former is used all year except during floods, and is located no more than 6–10 m (6.6–10.9 yd) from the water's edge. The construction of the burrow is not complex, often consisting of one or two passages 8–10 cm (3.1–3.9 in) in diameter and 1.40–1.50 m (1.53–1.64 yd) in length, leading to a nest chamber measuring 48 cm × 55 cm (19 in × 22 in). Nesting chambers are lined with straw, moss, mouse wool and bird feathers. It is more sedentary than the American mink, and will confine itself for long periods in its burrow in very cold weather.

=== Reproduction and development ===
During the mating season, the sexual organs of the female enlarge greatly and become pinkish-lilac in colour, which is in contrast with the female American mink, whose organs do not change. In the Moscow Zoo, estrus was observed on 22–26 April, with copulation lasting from 15 minutes to an hour. The average litter consists of three to seven kits. At birth, kits weigh about 6.5 grams (0.23 oz), and grow rapidly, trebling their weight 10 days after birth. They are born blind; the eyes open after 30–31 days. The lactation period lasts 2.0 to 2.5 months, though the kits eat solid food after 20–25 days. They accompany the mother on hunting expeditions at the age of 56–70 days, and become independent at the age 70–84 days.

=== Diet ===
The European mink has a diverse diet consisting largely of aquatic and riparian fauna. Differences between its diet and that of the American mink are small. Voles are the most important food source, closely followed by crustaceans, frogs and water insects. Fish are an important food source in floodlands, with cases being known of European minks catching fish weighing 1–1.2 kg (2.2–2.6 lb). The European mink's daily food requirement is 140–180 grams (4.9–6.3 oz). In times of food abundance, it caches its food.

== Range and status ==
The European mink is mostly restricted to Europe. Its range was widespread in the 19th century, with a distribution extending from northern Spain in the west to the river Ob (just east of the Urals) in the east, and from the Archangelsk region in the north to the northern Caucasus in the south. Over the last 150 years, though, it has severely declined by more than 90% and been extirpated or greatly reduced over most of its former range. The current range includes an isolated population in northern Spain and western France, which is widely disjunct from the main range in Eastern Europe (Latvia, Estonia, Belarus, Ukraine, central regions of European Russia, the Danube Delta in Romania and northwestern Bulgaria). It occurs from sea level to 1,120 m (1,220 yd). In Estonia, the European mink population has been successfully re-established on the island of Hiiumaa, and a project to re-establish them on the nearby island of Saaremaa is underway, with the first minks arriving in 2022.

== Decline ==
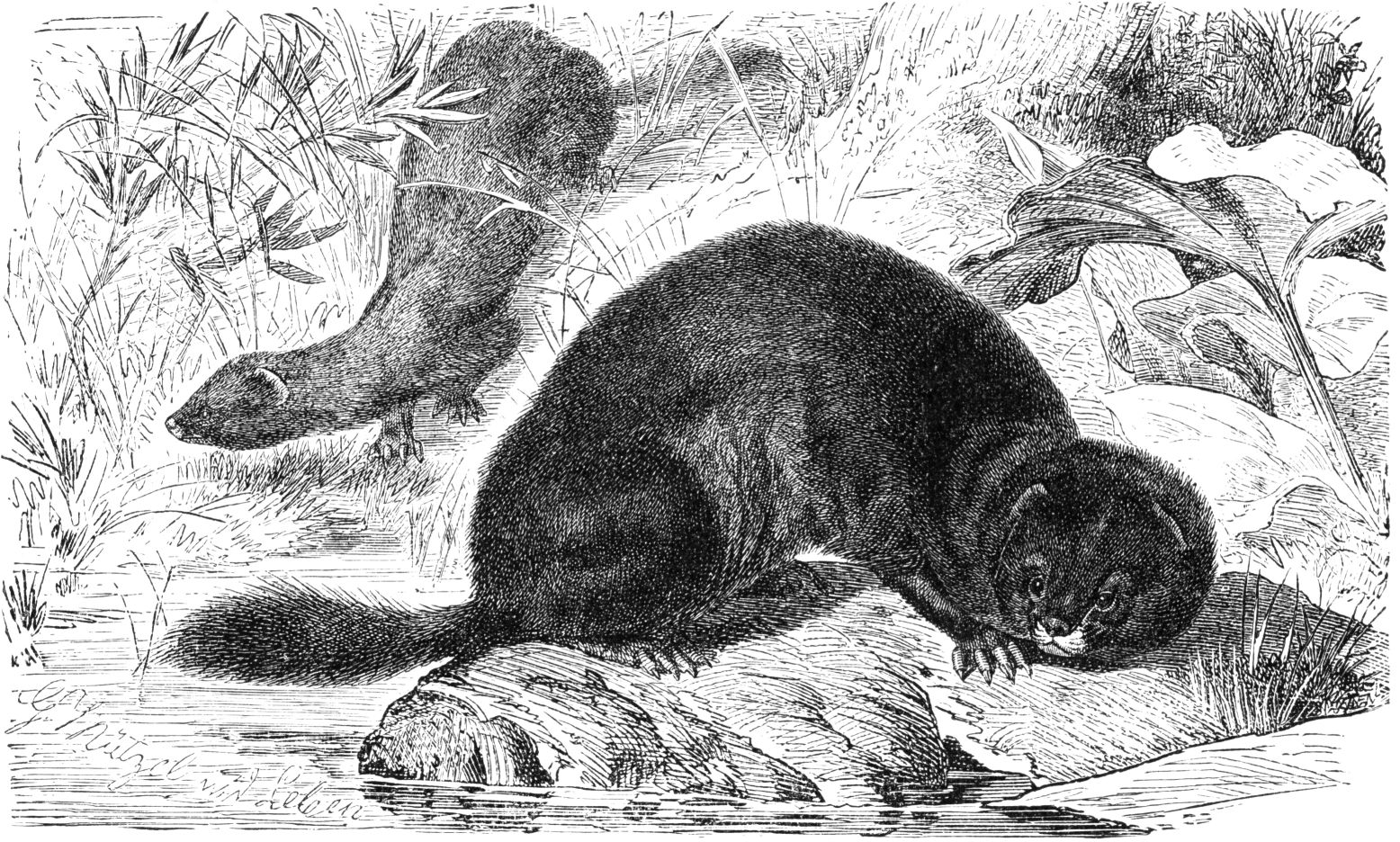
Illustration from Brehms Tierleben

The earliest actual records of decreases in European mink numbers occurred in Germany, having already become extinct in several areas by the middle of the 18th century. A similar pattern occurred in Switzerland, with no records of minks being published in the 20th century. Records of minks in Austria stopped by the late 18th century. By the 1930s–1950s, the European mink became extinct in Poland, Hungary, Czechoslovakia and possibly Bulgaria. In Finland, the main decline occurred in the 1920s-1950s and the species was thought to be extinct in the 1970s, though a few specimens were reported in the 1990s. In Latvia, the European mink was thought to be extinct for years, until a specimen was captured in 1992. In Lithuania, the last specimens were caught in 1978–79. The decline of the European mink in Estonia and Belarus was rapid during the 1980s, with only a few small, fragmented populations in the northeastern regions of both countries being reported in the 1990s. The decline of European mink numbers in Ukraine began in the late 1950s, with now only a few small and isolated populations being reported in the upper courses of the Ukrainian Carpathian rivers. Their numbers in Moldova began to drop very quickly in the 1930s, with the last known population having been confined to the lower course of the River Prut on the Romanian border by the late 1980s. In Romania, the European mink was very common and widely distributed, with 8000–10,000 being captured in 1960. Currently, Romanian mink populations are confined to the Danube Delta. In European Russia, the European mink was common and widespread in the early 20th century, but began to decline during the 1950s–1970s. The core of their range was in the Tver Region, though they began to decline there by the 1990s, which was worsened by a colonisation of the area by the American mink. Between 1981 and 1989, 388 European minks were introduced to two of the Kurile Islands, though by the 1990s, the population there was found to be lower than that originally released. In France and Spain, an isolated range occurs, extending from Brittany to northern Spain. Data from the 1990s indicate the European mink has disappeared from the northern half of this previous range.

=== Possible reasons for decline ===
==== Habitat loss ====
Habitat-related declines of European mink numbers may have started during the Little Ice Age, which was further aggravated by human activity. As the European mink is more dependent on wetland habitats than the American species, its decline in Central Europe, Estonia, Finland, Russia, Moldova and Ukraine has been linked to the drainage of small rivers. In mid-19th-century Germany, for example, European mink populations declined in a decade due to expanded land drainage. Although land improvement and river dredging certainly resulted in population decreases and fragmentation, in areas which still maintain suitable river ecosystems, such as Poland, Hungary, the former Czechoslovakia, Finland and Russia, the decline preceded the change in wetland habitats, and may have been caused by extensive agricultural development.

==== Overhunting ====
The European mink was historically hunted extensively, particularly in Russia, where in some districts, the decline prompted a temporary ban on mink hunting to let the population recover. In the early 20th century, 40–60,000 European minks were caught annually in the Soviet Union, with a record of 75,000 individuals (an estimate which exceeds the modern global European mink population). In Finland, annual mink catches reached 3000 specimens in the 1920s. In Romania, 10,000 minks were caught annually around 1960. However, this reason alone cannot account for the decline in areas where hunting was less intense, such as in Germany.

==== Decline of crayfish ====
The decline of European crayfish has been proposed as a factor in the drop in mink numbers, as minks are notably absent in the eastern side of the Urals, where crayfish are also absent. The decline in mink numbers has also been linked to the destruction of crayfish in Finland during the 1920s-1940s, when the crustaceans were infected with crayfish plague. The failure of the European mink to expand west to Scandinavia coincides with the gap in crayfish distribution.

==== Competition with the American mink and disease ====
The American mink was introduced and released in Europe during the 1920s–1930s. The American mink is less dependent on wetland habitats than the European mink and is 20-40% larger. The impact of feral American minks on European mink populations has been explained through the competitive exclusion principle and because the American mink reproduces a month earlier than the European species, and matings between male American minks and female European minks result in the embryos being reabsorbed. Thus, female European minks impregnated by male American minks are unable to reproduce with their conspecifics. Though the presence of the American mink has coincided with the decline of European mink numbers in Belarus and Estonia, the decline of the European mink in some areas preceded the introduction of the American mink by many years, and there are areas in Russia where the American species is absent, though European mink populations in these regions are still declining.

Diseases spread by the American mink can also account for the decline. Twenty-seven helminth species are recorded to infest the European mink, consisting of 14 trematodes, two cestodes and 11 nematodes. The mink is also vulnerable to pulmonary filariasis, krenzomatiasis and skrjabingylosis. In the Leningrad and Pskov Oblasts, 77.1% of European minks were found to be infected with skrjabingylosis.

==== Hybridisation and competition with the European polecat ====
In the early 20th century, northern Europe underwent a warm climatic period which coincided with an expansion of the range of the European polecat. The European mink possibly was gradually absorbed by the polecat due to hybridisation. Also, competition with the polecat has greatly increased, due to landscape change favouring the polecat. There is one record of a polecat attacking a mink and dragging it to its burrow.

Polecat-mink hybrids are termed khor'-tumak by furriers and khonorik by fanciers. Such hybridisation is very rare in the wild, and typically only occurs where European minks are declining. A polecat-mink hybrid has a poorly defined facial mask, yellow fur on the ears, grey-yellow underfur and long, dark brown guard hairs. Fairly large, the males attain the peak sizes known for European polecats (weighing 1,120–1,746 g (2.469–3.849 lb) and measuring 41–47 cm (16–19 in) in length), and females are much larger than female European minks (weighing 742 g (1.636 lb) and measuring 37 cm (15 in) in length). The majority of polecat-mink hybrids have skulls bearing greater similarities to those of polecats than to minks. Hybrids can swim well like minks and burrow for food like polecats. They are very difficult to tame and breed, as males are sterile, though females are fertile. The first captive polecat-mink hybrid was created in 1978 by Soviet zoologist Dr. Dmitry Ternovsky of Novosibirsk. Originally bred for their fur (which was more valuable than that of either parent species), the breeding of these hybrids declined as European mink populations decreased. Studies on the behavioural ecology of free-ranging polecat-mink hybrids in the upper reaches of the Lovat River indicate the hybrids will stray from aquatic habitats more readily than pure minks, and will tolerate both parent species entering their territories, though the hybrid's larger size (especially the male's) may deter intrusion. During the summer period, the diet of wild polecat-mink hybrids is more similar to that of the mink than to the polecat, as they feed predominantly on frogs. During the winter, their diets overlap more with those of polecats, and will eat a larger proportion of rodents than in the summer, though they still rely heavily on frogs and rarely scavenge ungulate carcasses as the polecat does.

==== Predation ====
Predators of the European mink include the European polecat, the American mink, the golden eagle, large owls and the red fox. Red fox numbers have increased greatly in areas where the wolf and Eurasian lynx have been extirpated, as well as areas where modern forestry is practised. As red foxes are known to prey on mustelids, excessive fox predation on the European mink is a possible factor, though it is improbable to have been a factor in Finland, where fox numbers were low during the early 20th century.
