= Archibald Thorburn =

Scottish artist (1860–1935)

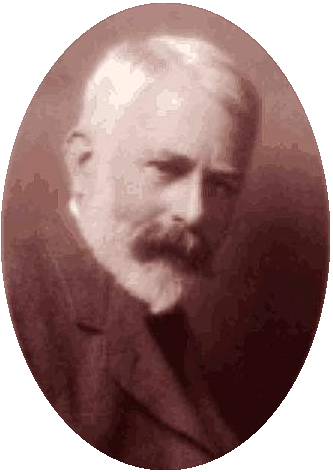
Archibald Thorburn

Archibald Thorburn FZS (31 May 1860 in Lasswade, Midlothian – 9 October 1935 in Hascombe, Surrey) was a Scottish artist who specialised in wildlife, painting mostly in watercolour. He explored Scotland to sketch birds in the wild, his favourite haunt being the Forest of Gaick near Kingussie in Inverness-shire. His images of British wildlife were set in front of dramatic backgrounds and were widely reproduced.

== Life and work ==
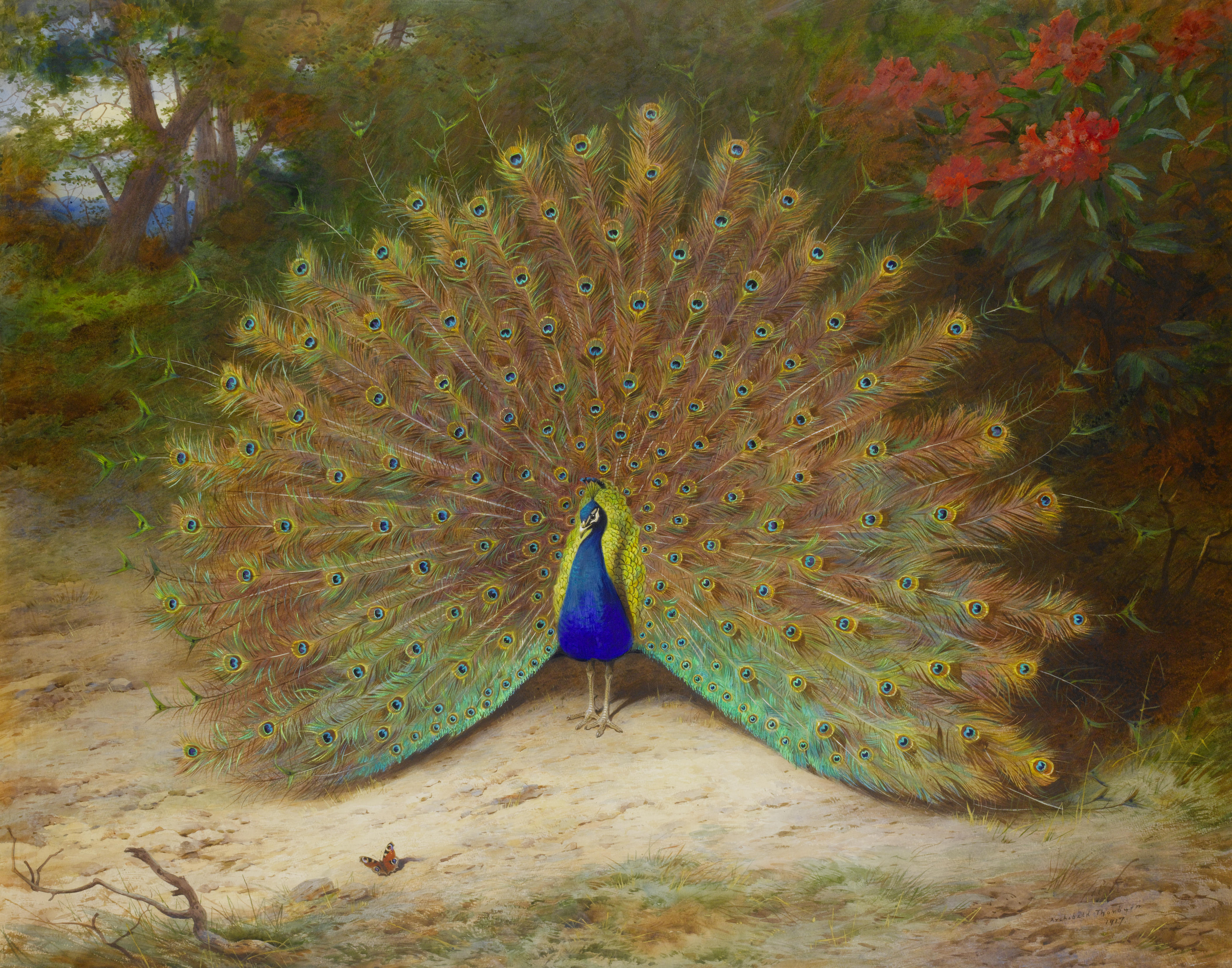
Peacock and Peacock Butterfly by Archibald Thorburn

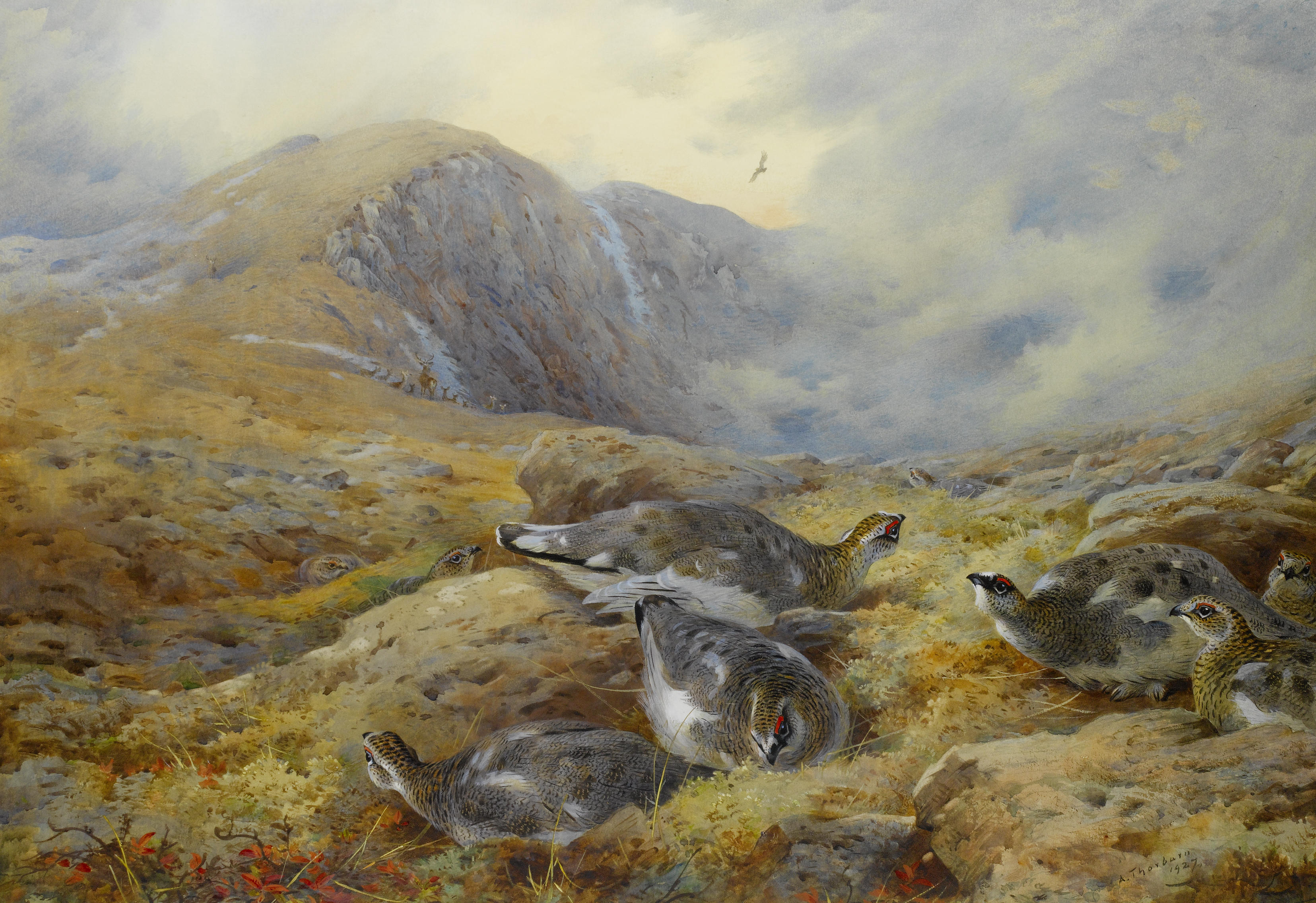
Danger Aloft - Ptarmigan

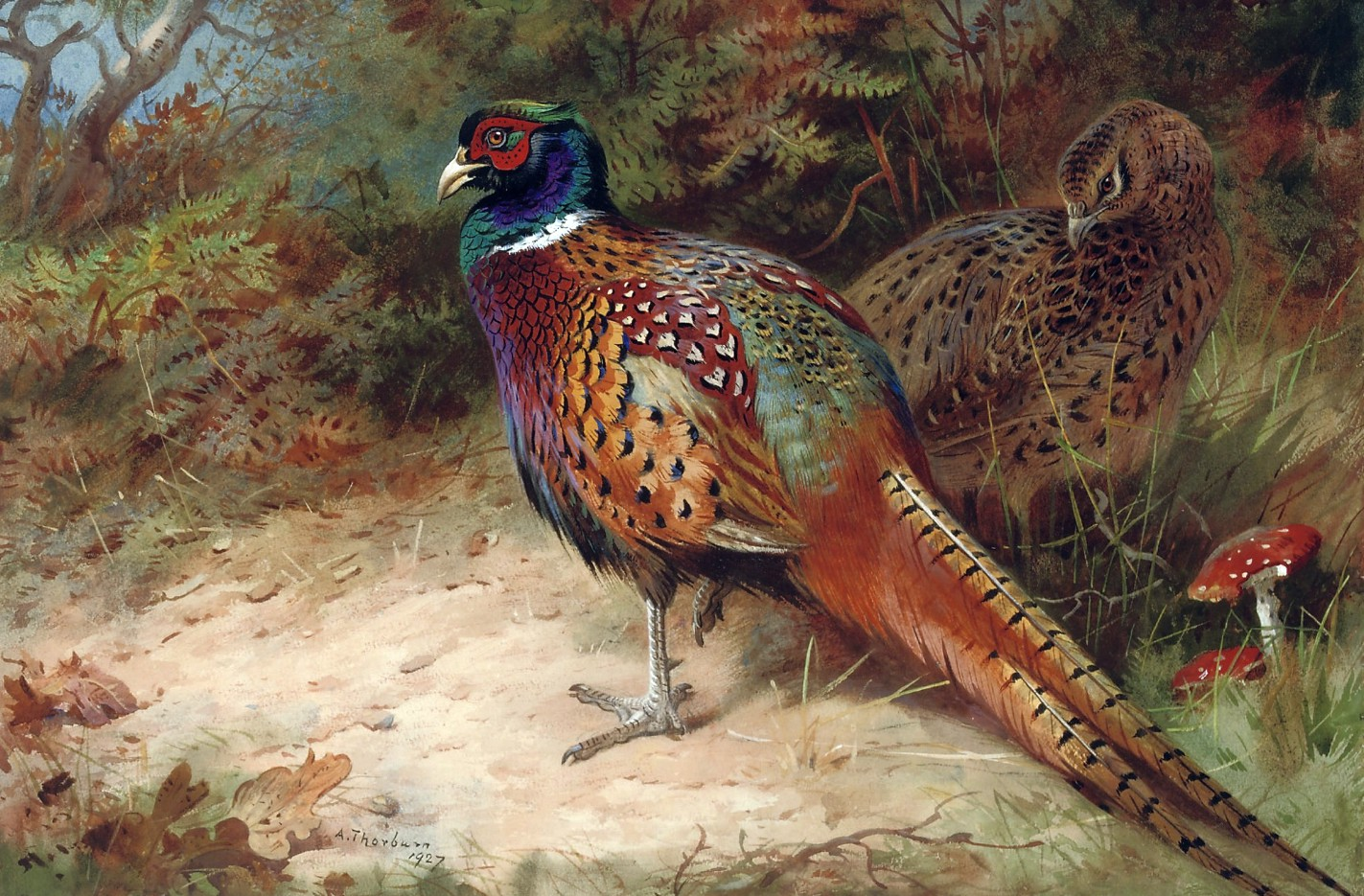
Cock and Hen Common Pheasant

Archibald was born at Viewfield House, Lasswade, Midlothian, the fifth son of Robert Thorburn (1818–1885), portrait miniaturist to Queen Victoria. His first education was at Dalkeith and in Edinburgh, after which he was sent to the newly founded St John's Wood School of Art in London. His stay there was only brief, since on the death of his father he sought the guidance of Joseph Wolf. It was his commission in 1887 to illustrate Lord Lilford's Coloured Figures of the Birds of the British Isles, for which he painted some 268 watercolours, that established his reputation. He illustrated numerous sporting and natural history books, including his own. He taught Otto Murray Dixon and Philip Rickman (both in Nature in Art's collection), and he encouraged the young Donald Watson when he came to visit him in Dumfries and Galloway. Thorburn was friends with other eminent bird illustrators including George Edward Lodge and John Guille Millais with whom he collaborated on a number of works including: Natural History of British Feeding Ducks; British Diving Ducks and British Game Birds.

His paintings were regularly exhibited at the Royal Academy and he designed their first Christmas card for the Royal Society for the Protection of Birds in 1899, a practice that he continued until 1935. He was Vice-President of the Royal Society for the Protection of Birds. In the 1890s Thorburn became disheartened by the British Institution and had his work shown at A. Baird Carter of 70 Jermyn Street.

On his marriage to Constance Mudie, Thorburn moved to High Leybourne in Hascombe in 1902, where he was to spend the rest of his life. In the 1930s he refused to make use of electric lighting, preferring natural light for his painting, and making use of lamps and candles. His grave is at St John the Baptist church in Busbridge, Godalming.

== Books illustrated ==
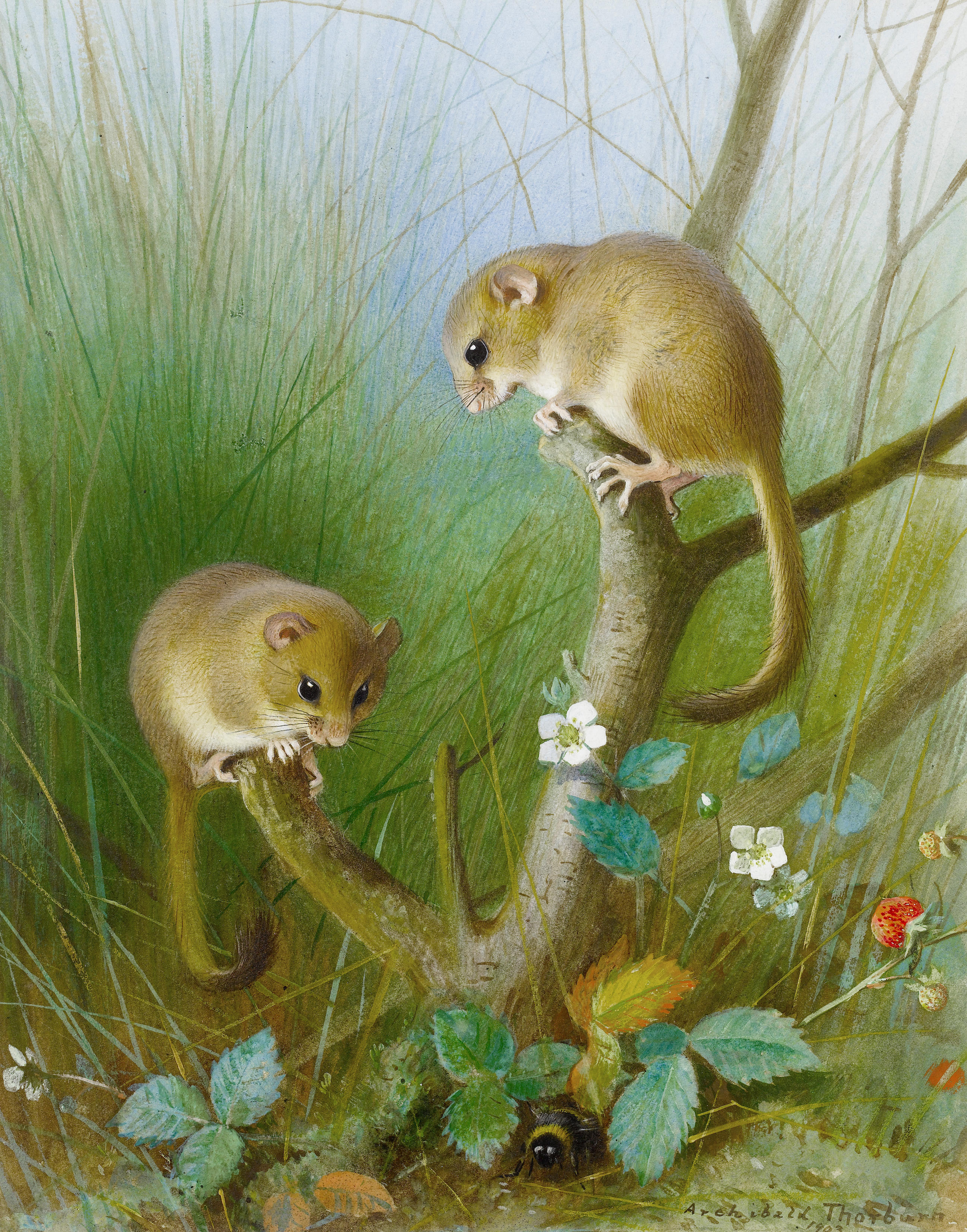
Dormice, 1903

- 1882 Sketches of Bird Life - J E Harting
- 1883–88 Familiar Wild Birds - W.F. Swaysland (a Sussex naturalist and taxidermist), 144 plates, 4 volumes
- 1885–97 Coloured Figures of the Birds of the British Isles - Lord Lilford, 268 watercolours, 7 volumes
- 1895 Ornithology of the Straits of Gibraltar by Leonard Howard Loyd Irby
- 1896 The Deer Forests of Scotland by Arthur Grimble, 8 plates
- 1915-16 British Birds - 4 volumes
- 1920 British Mammals
- 1920–25 The Birds of the British Isles and their eggs - Thomas Coward
- 1937 Observer Book of British Birds
- 1997 The Complete Illustrated Thorburn's Birds - Wordsworth Editions Ltd., ISBN 978-1-85326-492-4
- Thorburn's mammals - text by Gordon Corbet, Wordsworth Editions Ltd., ISBN 1-85326-493-8
Works

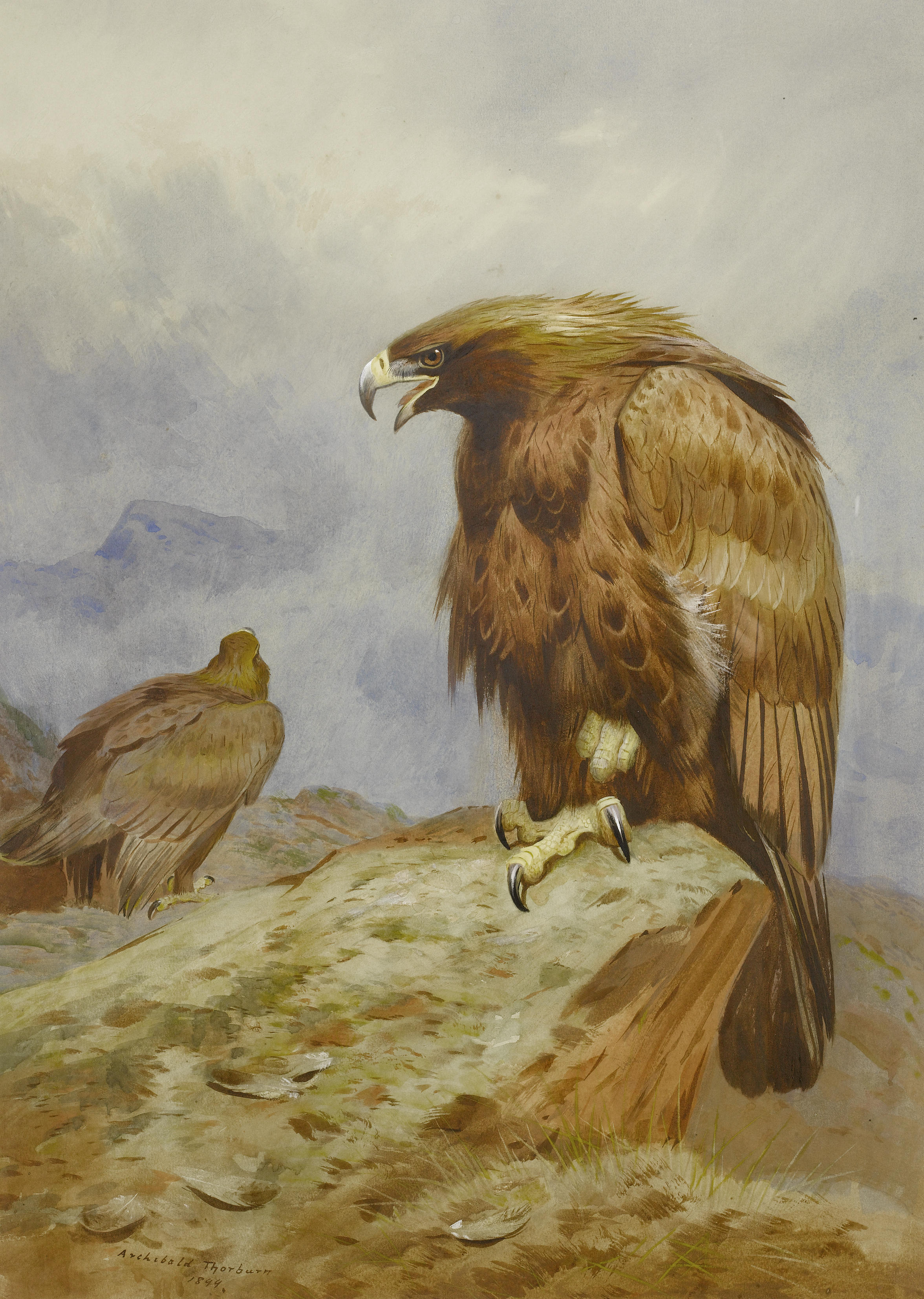
Pair of Golden Eagles

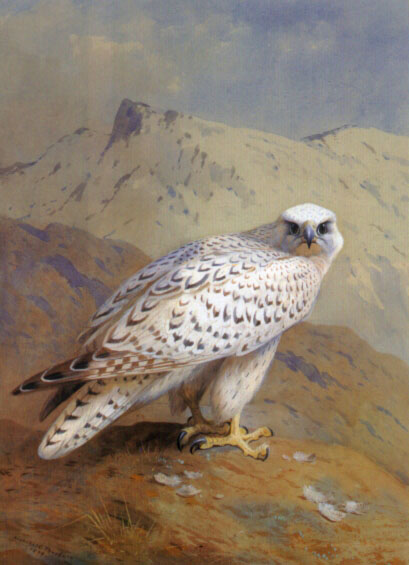
A Greenland or Gyr Falcon

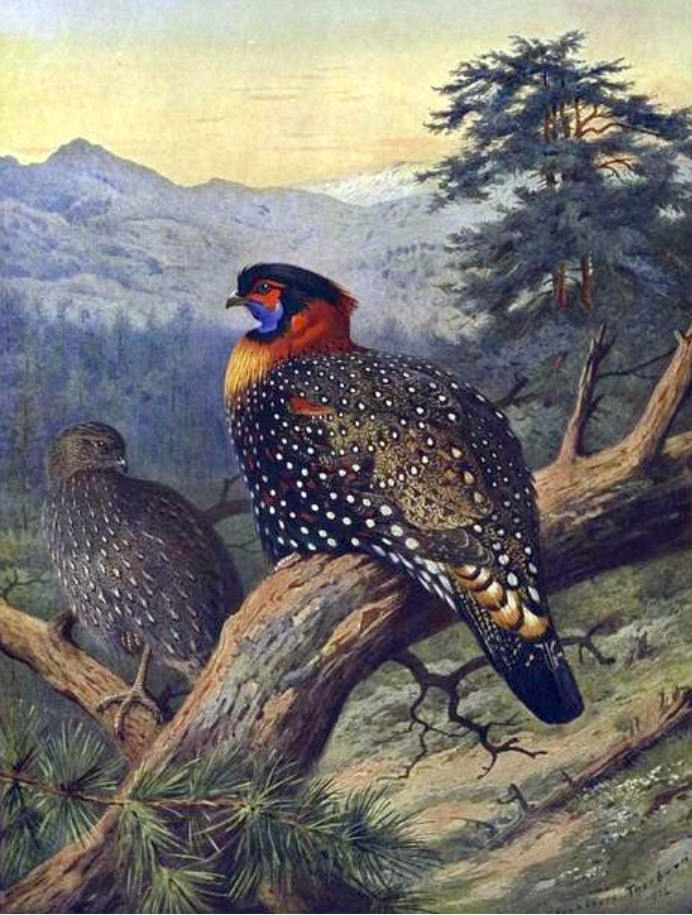
Western Tragopan

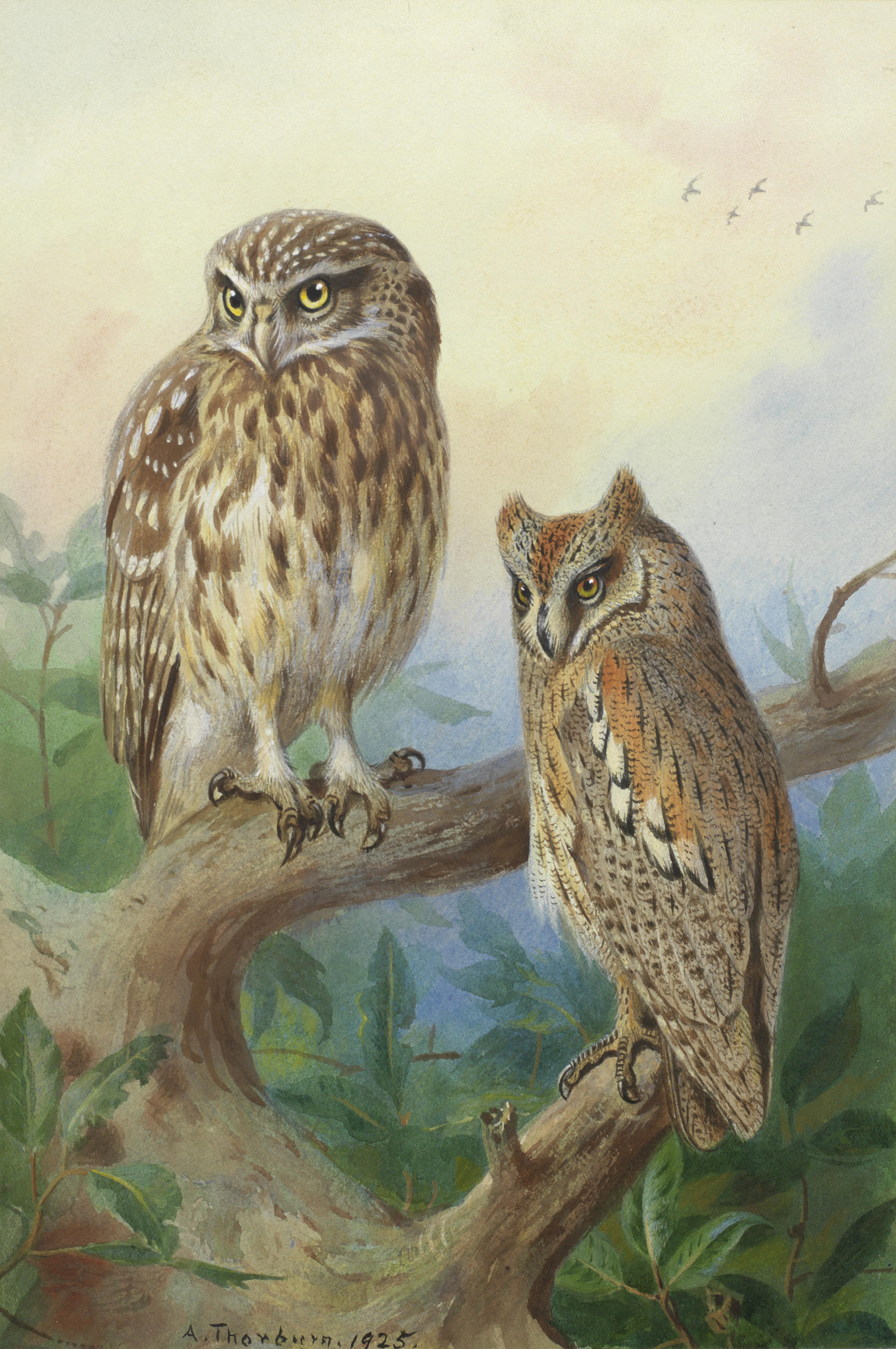
Little Owl and Scops Owl

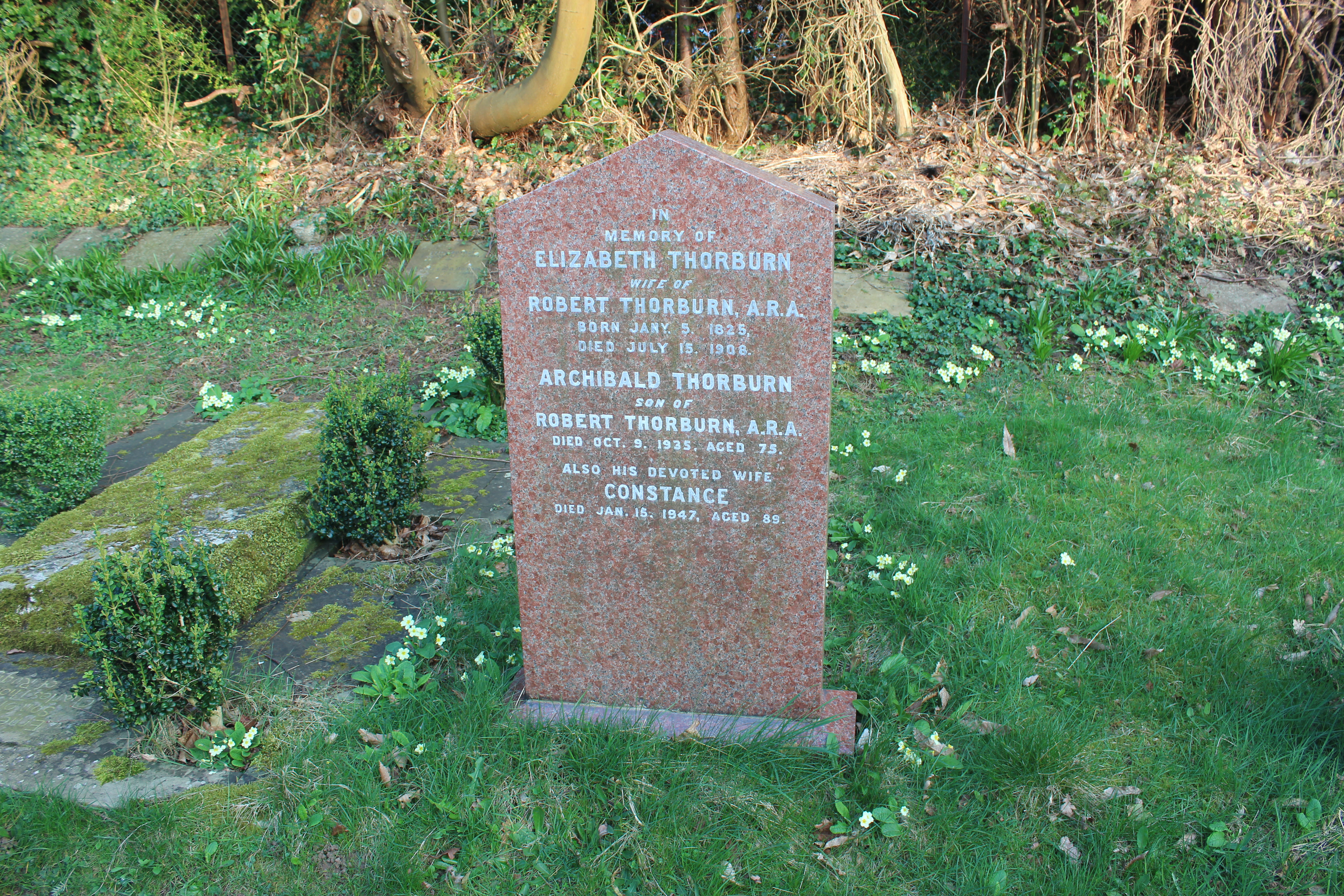
Grave at Busbridge Church in Surrey

== See also ==
- List of wildlife artists
- Eliza Turck (1832–1891), who also produced many illustrations for the 1883 edition of "Familiar Wild Birds".
