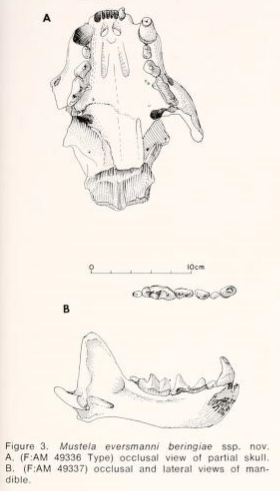
- Skull and jaw of a fossil

Scientific classification
- Kingdom: Animalia
- Phylum: Chordata
- Class: Mammalia
- Order: Carnivora
- Family: Mustelidae
- Genus: Mustela
- Species: M. eversmanii
- Subspecies: †M. e. beringiae

Trinomial name
- †Mustela eversmanii beringiae (Anderson, 1973)

= Mustela eversmanii beringiae =

Fossil subspecies of steppe polecat

Mustela eversmanii beringiae is a fossil subspecies of the steppe polecat. It was the largest subspecies of steppe polecat and was larger than the largest extant subspecies, the Baikal steppe polecat. This polecat subspecies inhabited the unglaciated steppes of Beringia, and may have migrated southwards to give rise to the black-footed ferret. It became extinct during the Late Pleistocene megafaunal extinctions.
