= Weasel war dance =

Colloquial term for the behavior of members of the weasel subfamily

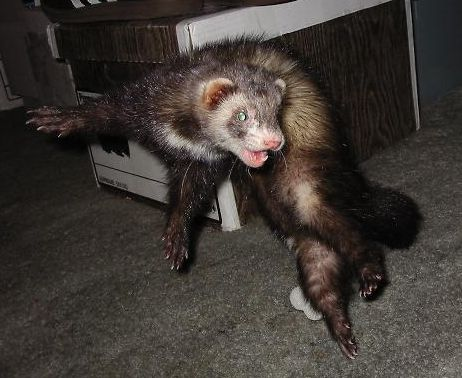
A domestic ferret in mid-leap

The weasel war dance or mustelid war dance is a colloquial term for the behavior of excited ferrets and other members of the weasel subfamily. Naturalists speculate that weasels in the wild use the dance to confuse or disorient prey.

== In domestic ferrets ==
In domestic ferrets the war dance usually follows play or the successful capture of a toy or a stolen object. The war dance is commonly held to mean that the ferret is thoroughly enjoying itself.

The behavior consists of a frenzied series of erratic leaps, often accompanied by an arched back and a frizzed-out tail. Ferrets are notoriously clumsy as they dance and will often collide with or fall over objects and furniture.

The war dance usually includes a clucking vocalization, known among domestic ferret owners as "dooking". It normally indicates happiness. Although the war dance may make a ferret appear frightened or angry, they are often just excited and are generally harmless to humans.

== In the wild ==
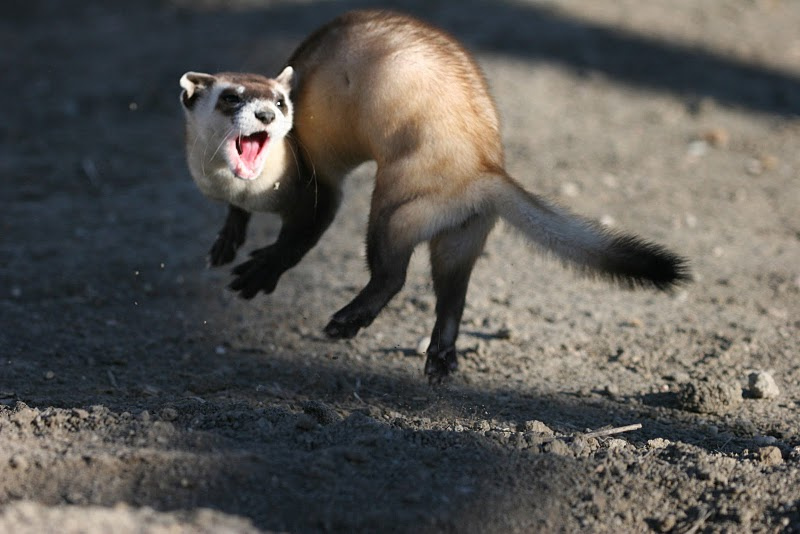
Black-footed ferret

The stoat (also known as the ermine or the short-tailed weasel) reputedly mesmerises prey such as rabbits by a "dance" (sometimes called the weasel war dance), though this behaviour could be linked to Skrjabingylus infections. In fact, all weasels, e.g., the least weasel, the European polecat, the steppe polecat, the black-footed ferret, etc., dance when they have caught or killed their prey in the wild.
