= Mustela stromeri =

Scientific classification
- Kingdom: Animalia
- Phylum: Chordata
- Class: Mammalia
- Order: Carnivora
- Family: Mustelidae
- Genus: Mustela
- Species: †M. stromeri

Binomial name
- †Mustela stromeri (Kormos, 1934)

Synonyms
- Putorius stromeri Kormos, 1934

Extinct species of mammal

Mustela stromeri is an extinct medium-sized species of mustelid and was the earliest known true species of polecat. It is ancestral to all modern ferrets and polecats.

== Taxonomy ==
Mustela stromeri, along with a number of other mustelid species, was first described by Hungarian geologist Tivadar Kormos in 1934, in the large village of Beremend. Its smaller size suggests that the subgenus Putorius (ferrets and polecats) evolved at a more recent date, presumably during the Villafranchian.

Mustela stromeri is ancestral to modern ferrets and polecats. The steppe polecat and European polecat evolved from Mustela stromeri in the Middle Pleistocene, whereas the black-footed ferret probably evolved from the former around 500 thousand to 2 million years ago.

== Range ==
Mustela stromeri was a mustelid believed have lived in vast territories of central Eurasia until its extinction during the Middle Pleistocene. Often, Mustela stromeri was found in Eastern Europe. Its remains have been unearthed in Austria, the Czech Republic, Hungary, and Romania, and date from the Villafranchian to the Günz II stadial.

== Description ==
As Mustela stromeri has been only described by fragmentary remains, its appearance and behaviours are not well-known. It was smaller in size in comparison to modern ferrets and polecats, though medium-sized for mustelids overall. Mustela stromeri's behaviour is disputed, as both kinds of polecats in Europe have contrasting habits.
