= Elizabeth Ann =

First cloned ferret

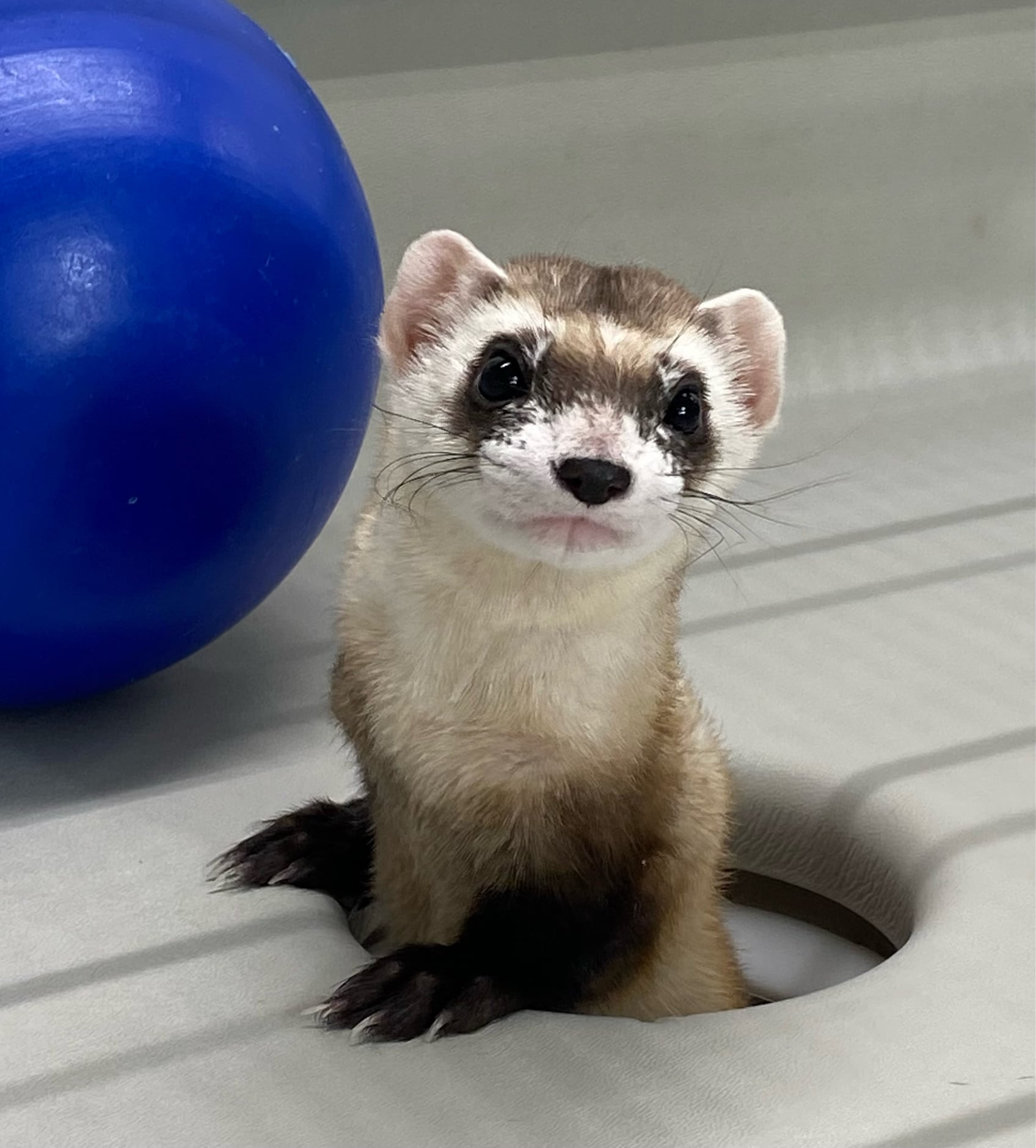
- Elizabeth Ann in 2021
- Species: Black-footed ferret
- Sex: Female
- Born: December 10, 2020; Fort Collins, Colorado
- Died: 2025 (aged 4–5)
- Known for: The first cloned black-footed ferret.

Elizabeth Ann (December 10, 2020 - 2025) was a black-footed ferret, the first U.S. endangered species to be cloned. The animal was cloned using the frozen cells from Willa, a black-footed female ferret who died in the 1980s and had no living descendants. The cloning process was led by Revive & Restore, a biodiversity non-profit.

== Background ==
Black-footed ferrets are the only ferret species native to the United States. The black-footed ferret is one of the rarest and most endangered land mammals in North America; a small pack of them was found in Wyoming in 1981. The limited genetic diversity found among the pack put the species at risk. Scientists sent genetic material from Willa to San Diego Zoo’s Frozen Zoo in 1988. Willa's egg was implanted in a surrogate domestic ferret in November 2020, to avoid putting an endangered ferret at risk. Elizabeth Ann was delivered via c-section on December 10, at a Fish and Wildlife Service facility in Fort Collins, Colorado.

== Life ==
Elizabeth Ann lived in Colorado and was studied for scientific purposes; she would not be released into the wild. By February 2022, Elizabeth Ann had reached puberty and scientists were looking for a viable mate. A panel discussion, organized by the Draper Natural History Museum in October 2022, informed the public that Elizabeth Ann had a hysterectomy for unspecified reasons, but also that other clones were on their way. Elizabeth Ann remained healthy but was unable to breed due to hydrometra, a condition causing fluid retention within the uterus, alongside an underdeveloped uterine horn. As these conditions are common in black-footed ferrets, they are not believed to be linked to the cloning process.

Elizabeth Ann died in 2025.

== Other clones ==
In April 2024, the U.S. Fish and Wildlife Service announced the birth of two new black-footed ferret clones, Noreen and Antonia, who were cloned from the same genetic material as Elizabeth Ann. Noreen was born at the National Black-footed Ferret Conservation Center in Colorado, while Antonia resides at the Smithsonian's National Zoo & Conservation Biology Institute near Front Royal, Virginia. Both were healthy and reaching expected developmental and behavioral milestones. The Service and its research partners planned to breed Noreen and Antonia once they reached reproductive maturity later in 2024. Antonia gave birth to a litter of three kits in June 2024, two of which (one female, one male) survived. Noreen died in 2025, but Antonia and her surviving offspring, Sibert and Red Cloud, all gave birth to litters at the Smithsonian's National Zoo and Conservation Biology Institute's conservation campus in Front Royal, Virginia in 2025.

== See also ==
- List of cloned animals
