= Ferret-legging =

Endurance test or stunt

Adult ferrets average about 18 inches (460 mm) from nose to the tip of the tail.

Ferret-legging was an endurance test or stunt in which ferrets are trapped in trousers worn by a participant. Also known as "put 'em down" and ferret-down-trousers, it seems to have once been popular among coal miners in Yorkshire, England. Contestants put live ferrets inside their trousers; the winner is the one who is the last to release the animals.

Ferret-legging may have originated during the time when only the relatively wealthy in England were allowed to keep animals used for hunting, forcing poachers to hide their illicit ferrets in their trousers. Following a brief resurgence in popularity during the 1970s, it has been described as a "dying sport", although a national ferret-legging event was held in Richmond, Virginia, US from 2003 to 2009.

== Description and rules ==
In the sport of ferret-legging, competitors tie their trousers at the ankles before placing two ferrets inside and securely fastening their belts to prevent the ferrets from escaping. Each competitor then stands in front of the judges for as long as he can. Competitors cannot be drunk or drugged, nor can the ferrets be sedated. In addition, competitors are not allowed to wear underwear beneath their trousers, which must allow the ferrets free access from one leg to the other, and the ferrets must have a full set of teeth that must not have been filed or otherwise blunted. The winner is the person who lasts the longest.

The sport is said to involve very little "native skill", simply an ability to "have your tool bitten and not care". The former world champion, Reg Mellor, is credited with instituting the practice of wearing white trousers in ferret-legging matches, to better display the blood from the wounds caused by the animals. Competitors can attempt, from outside their trousers, to dislodge the ferrets, but as the animals can maintain a strong hold for long periods, their removal can be difficult.

The ferrets are occasionally put inside the contestants' shirts in addition to their trousers. An attempt to introduce a female version of the sport—ferret busting, in which female contestants introduced ferrets down their blouses—proved unsuccessful.

== Origin ==
The origin of ferret-legging is disputed. The sport seems to have become popular among coal miners in Yorkshire, England, in the 1970s, though some Scots claim it gained popularity in Scotland. According to Marlene Blackburn of the Richmond Ferret Rescue League, ferret-legging originated in public houses "where patrons would bet on who could keep a ferret in his pants the longest." The sport may alternatively have originated during the time when only the relatively wealthy in England were allowed to keep ferrets used for hunting, forcing the animal poachers to hide their illicit ferrets in their trousers to avoid detection by gamekeepers.

The pastime gained attention in a humorous article written by Don Katz, entitled "King of the Ferret Leggers," in the October 1987 issue of Outside magazine. Katz described ferrets as "having claws like hypodermic needles and teeth like number 16 carpet tacks". James Howard of The Fresno Bee said Katz failed to explain why anyone would want to participate in a sport such as ferret-legging, but the article "offers a glimpse into the human need to challenge the edges of human endurance".

== Records ==
In 1972, the ferret-legging record stood at 40 seconds. A few years later, the record had risen to over one minute, and eventually to 90 minutes. In 1977, Edward Simpkins from the Isle of Wight set the new world record of five hours and ten minutes, although he only had one ferret in his trousers during the first four hours and two for the last seventy minutes. Simpkins sustained two large bites during his record-breaking attempt, but continued to play a game of darts undeterred.

Retired miner Reg Mellor, from Barnsley, set the new world record time of five hours and twenty-six minutes on 5 July 1981 at the Annual Pennine Show at Holmfirth, Yorkshire. He had practised the sport since his youth, but had received no recognition until he set the new world record. Mellor, who had hunted with ferrets in the dales outside Barnsley for many years, had grown accustomed to keeping them in his trousers to keep them warm and dry when out working in the rain. Mellor's "trick" was to ensure that the ferrets were well-fed before they were inserted into his trousers.

In 1986, Mellor attempted to break his own record before a crowd of 2,500 spectators, intending to beat the "magic six-hour mark—the four-minute mile of ferret legging". After five hours, most of the attendees had become bored and left; workmen arrived to dismantle the stage, despite Mellor's protests that he was on his way to a new record. According to Adrian Tame of the Sunday Herald Sun, Mellor retired after that experience, "disillusioned and broken-hearted," but with his dignity and manhood intact. Mellor had hoped to organise an annual national competition held in his home town of Barnsley, and offered a prize of £100 to anyone who could beat him.

Frank Bartlett, a retired headmaster, and Christine Farnsworth, broke Mellor's record in 2010. The pair managed five hours and thirty minutes, raising £1,000 for the Whittington Community First Responders.

== Reception ==
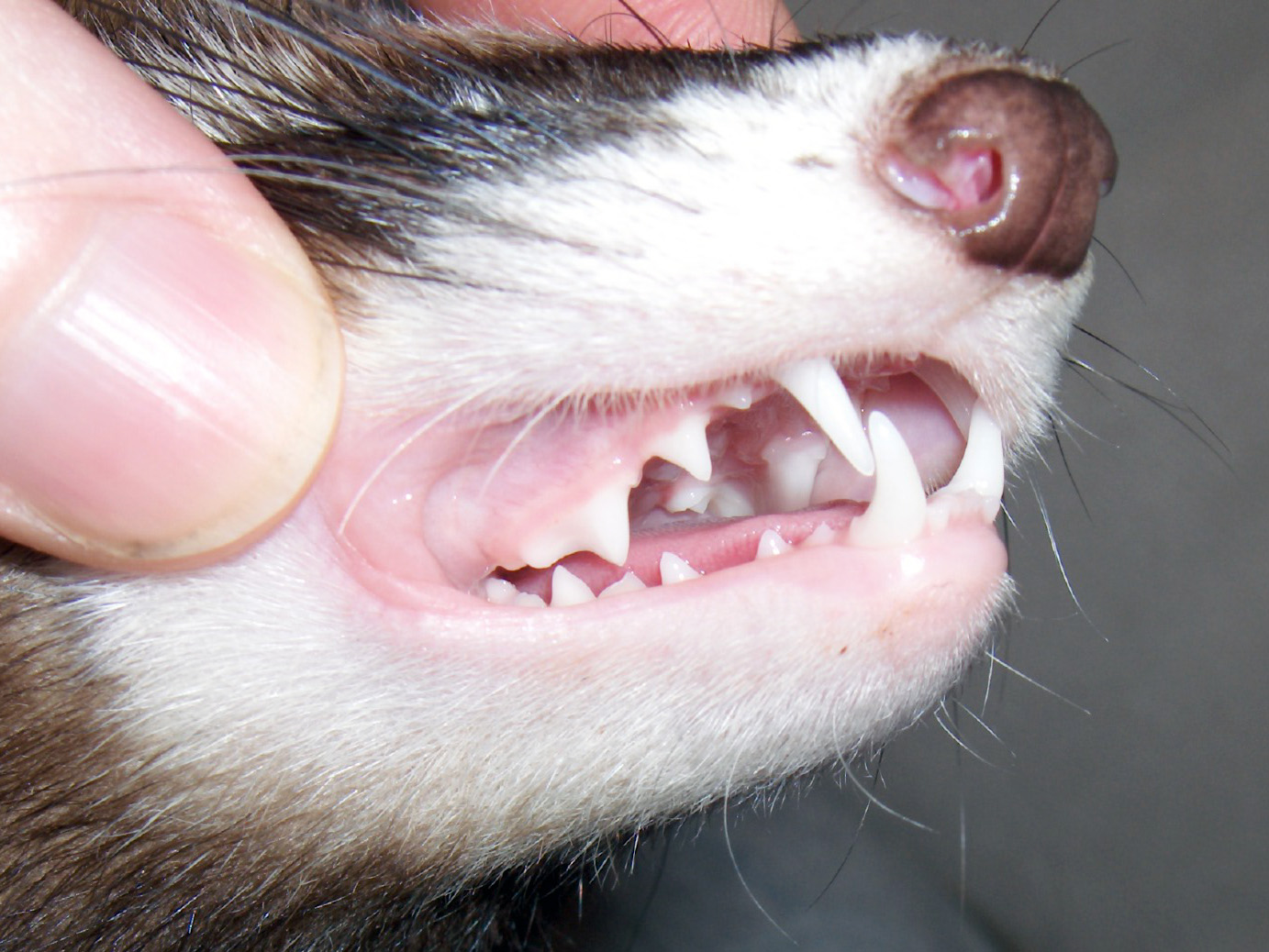
Despite their sharp teeth, ferrets have been called "generally ... harmless, fun-loving creatures" by people associated with the sport.

Ferret-legging has existed for centuries, but the sport made a brief resurgence in popularity during the 1970s. According to a 2005 report published in the English Northern Echo newspaper, whether due to a "lack of brave contestants or complaining wives", ferret-legging is now "a dying sport" that is being replaced by ferret racing, in which the animals race through a plastic pipe. Although the sport is now uncommon, annual competitions were held at the Richmond Highland Games & Celtic Festival in Richmond, Virginia from 2003 through 2009. In 2007 the Manitoba Ferret Association held a ferret-legging competition in St. Vital Park, Winnipeg, to raise money in support of the organization's shelter for homeless ferrets. Marlene Blackburn, who works with the Ferret Rescue League to ensure that no ferrets are harmed in the sport, claims that during the years the competitions have been held in Richmond no contestant has ever been bitten, although some may get a few scratches. According to Kelly Yager of the Manitoba Ferret Association, the animals actually like small, confined spaces. Jay Lugar, spokesman for the Richmond Highland Games & Celtic Festival, said ferrets are "generally very harmless, fun-loving creatures." Reg Mellor, however, commented that at their very worst, they can be "cannibals, things that live only to kill, that'll eat your eyes out to get at your brain".

Christopher Borrelli of The Blade describes ferret-legging as a "remarkable" sport in which you get "more agony of defeat than thrill of victory," and Louis Mahoney of the Richmond Times-Dispatch said it is "sure to bring a laugh." Cracked listed it as the fifth "most baffling" sport in the world. The Atlanta Journal's Scott Bernarde commented that anyone who has tried ferret-legging "will agree that falling off a mountain isn't all that bad." American sportswriter Rick Reilly of ESPN tried ferret-legging as part of his quest to find "the world's dumbest sport" for a book published in 2010.

Mellor made a brief appearance in the 1976 television documentary presented by actor and wrestler Brian Glover entitled It's no joke living in Barnsley, in which he demonstrated ferret-legging. During his appearance on The Tonight Show with Jay Leno in May 1996, actor Paul Hogan (Crocodile Dundee) spent much of the interview with Leno talking about ferret-legging, which he identified as "a new Australian Olympics event." In November 1992, the J. Walter Thompson advertising firm produced television commercials for the California State Lottery that compared keno with ferret-legging. One of the commercials concludes that keno "as you can imagine, is lots better than a ferret in your trousers."
