= Black-footed ferret =

Conservation status
- Endangered (IUCN 3.1)
- CITES Appendix I

Scientific classification
- Kingdom: Animalia
- Phylum: Chordata
- Class: Mammalia
- Order: Carnivora
- Family: Mustelidae
- Genus: Mustela
- Subgenus: Putorius
- Species: M. nigripes

Binomial name
- Mustela nigripes (Audubon & Bachman, 1851)

Synonyms
- Putorius nigripes Audubon and Bachman, 1851

Species of carnivore

The black-footed ferret (Mustela nigripes), also known as the American polecat or prairie dog hunter, is a mustelid species native to central North America. It is roughly the size of a mink and is similar in appearance to the European polecat and the Asian steppe polecat. It is largely nocturnal and solitary, except when breeding or raising litters. Up to 90% of its diet is composed of prairie dogs.

The black-footed ferret declined throughout the 20th century, primarily as a result of decreases in prairie dog populations and sylvatic plague. It was declared extinct in 1979, but a residual wild population was discovered in 1981 in Meeteetse, Wyoming. A captive-breeding program launched by the United States Fish and Wildlife Service resulted in its reintroduction into eight western US states, Canada, and Mexico from 1991 to 2009. As of 2026, about 300 individuals live in wild populations, with four self-sustaining populations in South Dakota, Arizona, and Wyoming. It was first listed as "endangered" in 1982, then as "extinct in the wild" in 1996 before being moved back up to "endangered" in the IUCN Red List in 2008. In February 2021, the first successful clone of a black-footed ferret, a female named Elizabeth Ann, was introduced to the public.

== Evolution ==
Like its close relative, the Asian steppe polecat (with which it was once thought to be conspecific), the black-footed ferret represents a more progressive form than the European polecat in the direction of carnivory. The black-footed ferret's most likely ancestor was Mustela stromeri (from which the European and steppe polecats are also derived), which originated in Europe during the Middle Pleistocene. Molecular evidence indicates that the steppe polecat and black-footed ferret diverged from M. stromeri between 500,000 and 2,000,000 years ago, perhaps in Beringia. The species appeared in the Great Basin and the Rockies by 750,000 years ago. The oldest recorded fossil find originates from Cathedral Cave, White Pine County, Nevada, and dates back 750,000 to 950,000 years ago. Prairie dog fossils have been found in six sites that yield ferrets, thus indicating that the association between the two species is an old one. Anecdotal observations and 42% of examined fossil records indicated that any substantial colony of medium- to large-sized colonial ground squirrels, such as Richardson's ground squirrels, may provide a sufficient prey base and a source of burrows for black-footed ferrets. This suggests that the black-footed ferret and prairie dogs did not historically have an obligate predator–prey relationship. The species has likely always been rare, and the modern black-footed ferret represents a relict population. A reported occurrence of the species is from a late Illinoian deposit in Clay County, Nebraska, and it is further recorded from Sangamonian deposits in Nebraska and Medicine Hat, Alberta. Fossils have also been found in Alaska dating from the Pleistocene.

== Description ==
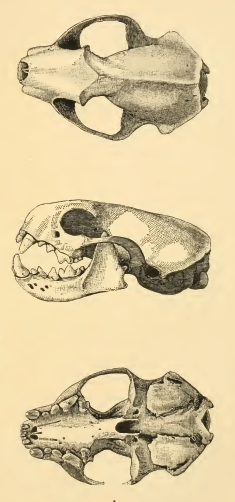
Skull, as illustrated in Merriam's Synopsis of the weasels of North America

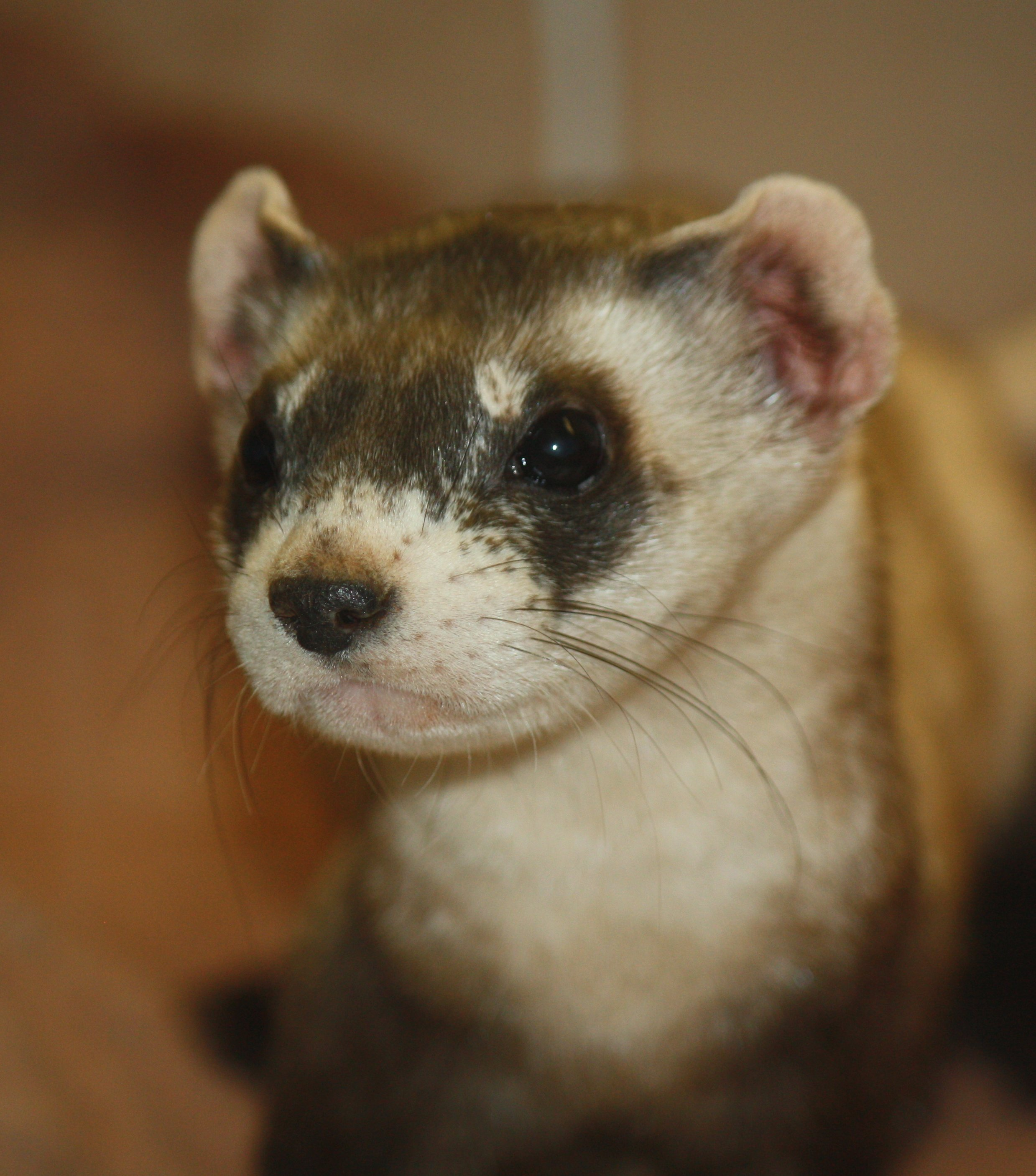
Black-footed ferret at the Louisville Zoo

The black-footed ferret has a long, slender body with black outlines on its paws, ears, parts of its face and its tail. The forehead is arched and broad, and the muzzle is short. It has few whiskers, and its ears are triangular, short, erect and broad at the base. The neck is long and the legs short and stout. The toes are armed with sharp, very slightly arched claws. The feet on both surfaces are covered in hair, even to the soles, thus concealing the claws. It combines several physical features common in both members of the subgenus Gale (least and short-tailed weasels) and Putorius (European and steppe polecats). Its skull resembles that of polecats in its size, massiveness and the development of its ridges and depressions, though it is distinguished by the extreme degree of constriction behind the orbits where the width of the cranium is much less than that of the muzzle.

Although similar in size to polecats, its attenuate body, long neck, very short legs, slim tail, large orbicular ears and close-set pelage is much closer in conformation to weasels and stoats. The dentition of the black-footed ferret closely resembles that of the European and steppe polecat, though the back lower molar is vestigial, with a hemispherical crown which is too small and weak to develop the little cusps which are more apparent in polecats. It differs from the European polecat by the greater contrast between its dark limbs and pale body and the shorter length of its black tail-tip. In contrast, differences from the steppe polecat of Asia are slight, to the point where the two species were once thought to be conspecific. The only noticeable differences between the black-footed ferret and the steppe polecat are the former's much shorter and coarser fur, larger ears, and longer post molar extension of the palate.

Males measure 500–533 millimetres (19.7–21.0 in) in body length and 114–127 millimetres (4.5–5.0 in) in tail length, thus constituting 22–25% of its body length. Females are typically 10% smaller than males. It weighs 650–1,400 grams (1.43–3.09 lb). Captive-bred ferrets used for the reintroduction projects were found to be smaller than their wild counterparts, though these animals rapidly attained historical body sizes once released.

The base color is pale yellowish or buffy above and below. The top of the head and sometimes the neck is clouded by dark-tipped hairs. The face is crossed by a broad band of sooty black, which includes the eyes. The feet, lower parts of the legs, the tip of the tail and the preputial region are sooty-black. The area midway between the front and back legs is marked by a large patch of dark umber-brown, which fades into the buffy surrounding parts. A small spot occurs over each eye, with a narrow band behind the black mask. The sides of the head and the ears are dirty-white in color.

== Behavior and ecology ==
=== Territorial behavior ===
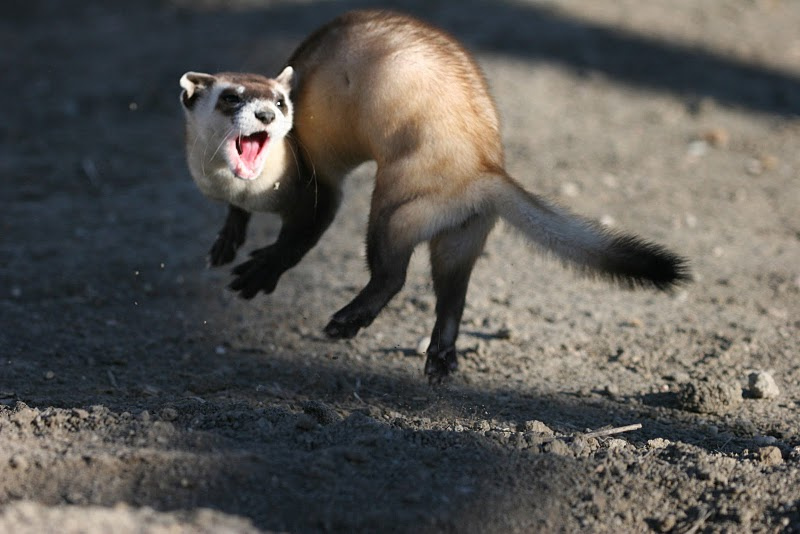
Black-footed ferret performing a weasel war dance

The black-footed ferret is solitary, except when breeding or raising litters. It is nocturnal and primarily hunts for sleeping prairie dogs in their burrows. It is most active above ground from dusk to midnight and 4 am to mid-morning. Aboveground activity is greatest during late summer and early autumn when juveniles become independent. Climate generally does not limit black-footed ferret activity, but it may remain inactive inside burrows for up to 6 days at a time during winter.

Female black-footed ferrets have smaller home ranges than males. Home ranges of males may sometimes include the home ranges of several females. Adult females usually occupy the same territory every year. A female that was tracked from December to March occupied 39.5 acres (16 ha). Her territory was overlapped by a resident male that occupied 337.5 acres (137 ha) during the same period. The average density of black-footed ferrets near Meeteetse, Wyoming, is estimated at one black-footed ferret to 148 acres (60 ha). As of 1985, 40 to 60 black-footed ferrets occupied a total of 6,178 to 7,413 acres (2,500 to 3,000 ha) of white-tailed prairie dog habitat. From 1982 to 1984, the average year-round movement of 15 black-footed ferrets between white-tailed prairie dog colonies was 1.6 miles/night (2.5 km) (with a spread of 1.1 miles or 1.7 km). Movement of black-footed ferrets between prairie dog colonies is influenced by factors including breeding activity, season, sex, intraspecific territoriality, prey density, and expansion of home ranges with declining population density. Movements of black-footed ferrets have been shown to increase during the breeding season; however, snow-tracking from December to March over a 4-year period near Meeteetse, Wyoming, revealed that factors other than breeding were responsible for movement distances.

Temperature is positively correlated with distance of black-footed ferret movement. Snow-tracking from December to March over a 4-year period near Meeteetse, Wyoming, revealed that movement distances were shortest during winter and longest between February and April, when black-footed ferrets were breeding and white-tailed prairie dogs emerged from hibernation. Nightly movement distance of 170 black-footed ferrets averaged 0.87 miles (1.40 km) (range 0.001 to 6.91 miles (0.0016 to 11.1206 kilometres)). Nightly activity areas of black-footed ferrets ranged from 1 to 337.5 acres (0 to 137 ha)), and were larger from February to March (110.2 acres (45 ha)) than from December to January (33.6 acres (14 ha)). Adult females establish activity areas based on access to food for rearing young. Males establish activity areas to maximize access to females, resulting in larger activity areas than those of females.

Prey density may account for movement distances. Black-footed ferrets may travel up to 11 miles (18 km) to seek prey, suggesting that they will interchange freely among white-tailed prairie dog colonies that are less than 11 miles (18 km) apart. In areas of high prey density, black-footed ferret movements were nonlinear in character, probably to avoid predators. From December to March over a 4-year study period, black-footed ferrets investigated 68 white-tailed prairie dog holes per 1 mile (1.6 km) of travel/night. Distance traveled between white-tailed prairie dog burrows from December to March averaged 74.2 feet (22.6 m) over 149 track routes.

=== Reproduction and development ===
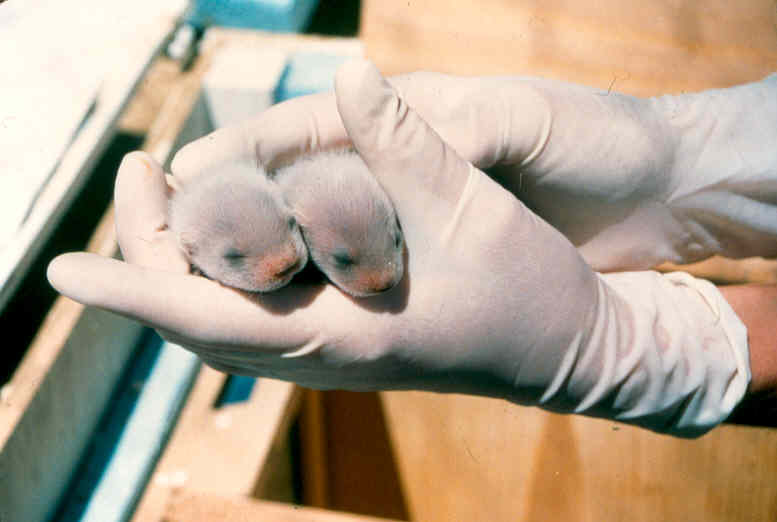
Black-footed ferret kits

The reproductive physiology of the black-footed ferret is similar to that of the European polecat and the steppe polecat. It is probably polygynous, based on data collected from home range sizes, skewed sex ratios, and sexual dimorphism. Mating occurs in February and March. When a male and female in estrus encounter each other, the male sniffs the genital region of the female, but does not mount her until after a few hours have elapsed, which is in contrast to the more violent behavior displayed by the male European polecat. During copulation, the male grasps the female by the nape of the neck, with the copulatory tie lasting from 1.5 to 3.0 hours. Unlike other mustelids, the black-footed ferret is a habitat specialist with low reproductive rates. In captivity, gestation of black-footed ferrets lasts 42–45 days. Litter size ranges from one to five kits. Kits are born in May and June in prairie dog burrows. Kits are altricial and are raised by their mother for several months after birth. Kits first emerge above ground in July, at 6 weeks old. They are then separated into individual prairie dog burrows around their mother's burrow. Kits reach adult weight and become independent several months following birth, from late August to October. Sexual maturity occurs at the age of one year.

Intercolony dispersal of juvenile black-footed ferrets occurs several months after birth, from early September to early November. Dispersal distances may be short or long. Near Meeteetse, Wyoming, 9 juvenile males and three juvenile females dispersed 1 to 4 mi (1.6 to 6.4 km) following litter breakup. Four juvenile females dispersed a short distance (<0.2 mi (0.32 km)), but remained on their natal area.

== Diet ==
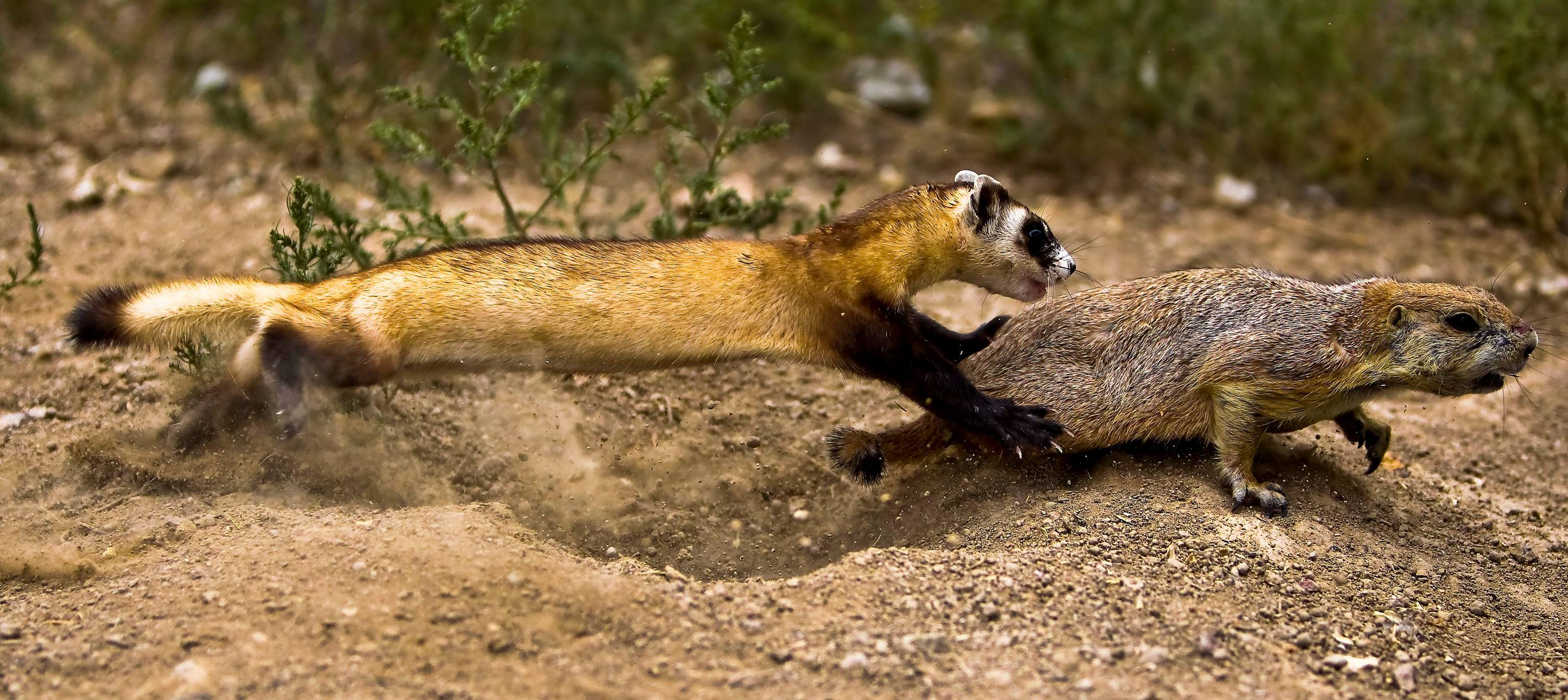
Black-footed ferret chasing prairie dog

Up to 90% of the black-footed ferret's diet is composed of prairie dogs. The remaining 10% of their diet is composed of small rodents, and lagomorphs. Their diet varies depending on geographic location. In western Colorado, Utah, Wyoming, and Montana, black-footed ferrets are historically associated with white-tailed prairie dogs and were forced to find alternative prey when white-tailed prairie dogs entered their four-month hibernation cycle. In Wyoming, alternative prey items consumed during white-tailed prairie dog hibernation included voles (Microtus spp.) and mice (Peromyscus and Mus spp.) found near streams. In South Dakota, black-footed ferrets associate with black-tailed prairie dogs. Because black-tailed prairie dogs do not hibernate, little seasonal change in black-footed ferret diet is necessary.

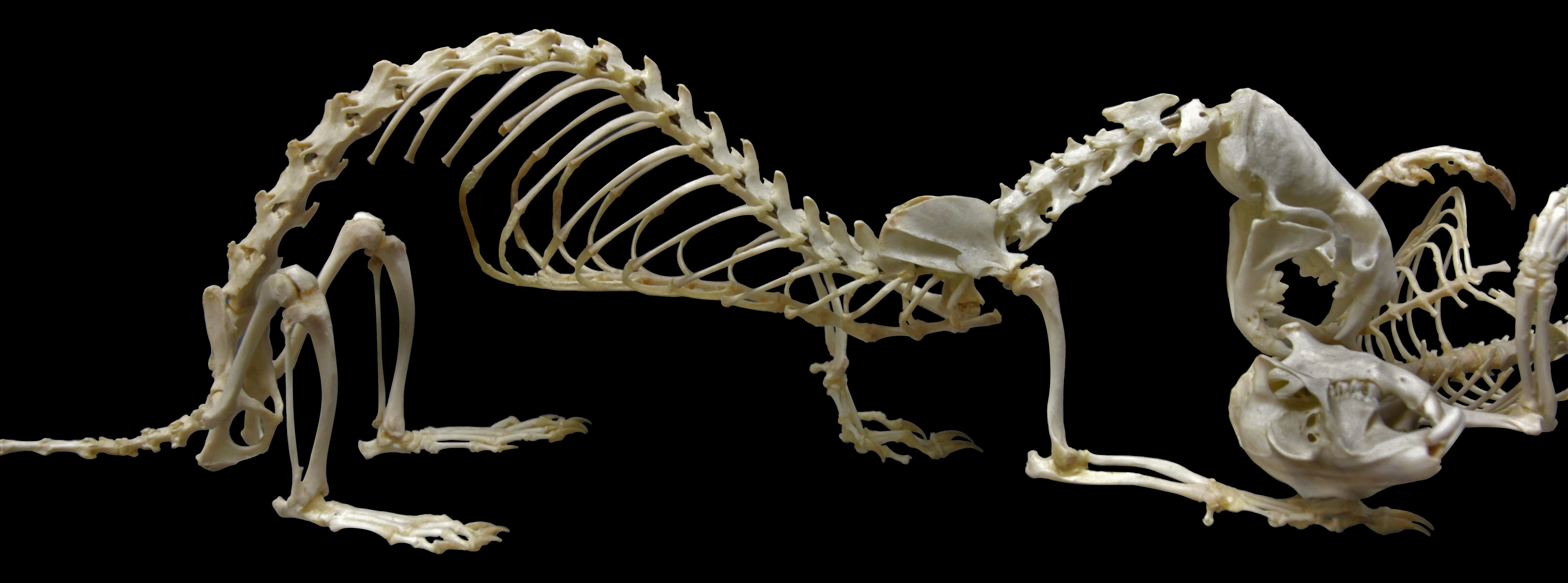
Skeletons of black-footed ferret (left) and prairie dog (right) articulated to show the predator-prey relationship between the two. (Museum of Osteology)

In Mellette County, South Dakota, black-tailed prairie dog remains occurred in 91% of 82 black-footed ferret scats. Mouse remains occurred in 26% of scats. Mouse remains could not be identified to species; however, deer mice, northern grasshopper mice, and house mice were captured in snap-trap surveys. Potential prey items included thirteen-lined ground squirrels, plains pocket gophers, mountain cottontails, upland sandpipers, horned larks, and western meadowlarks.

Based on 86 black-footed ferret scats found near Meeteetse, Wyoming, 87% of their diet was composed of white-tailed prairie dogs. Other food items included deer mice, sagebrush voles, meadow voles, mountain cottontails, and white-tailed jackrabbits. Water is obtained through consumption of prey.

A study published in 1983 modeling metabolizable energy requirements estimated that one adult female black-footed ferret and her litter require about 474 to 1,421 black-tailed prairie dogs per year or 412 to 1,236 white-tailed prairie dogs per year for sustenance. They concluded that this dietary requirement would require protection of 91 to 235 acres (37 to 95 ha) of black-tailed prairie dog habitat or 413 to 877 acres (167 to 355 ha) of white-tailed prairie dog habitat for each female black-footed ferret with a litter.

== Distribution and habitat ==
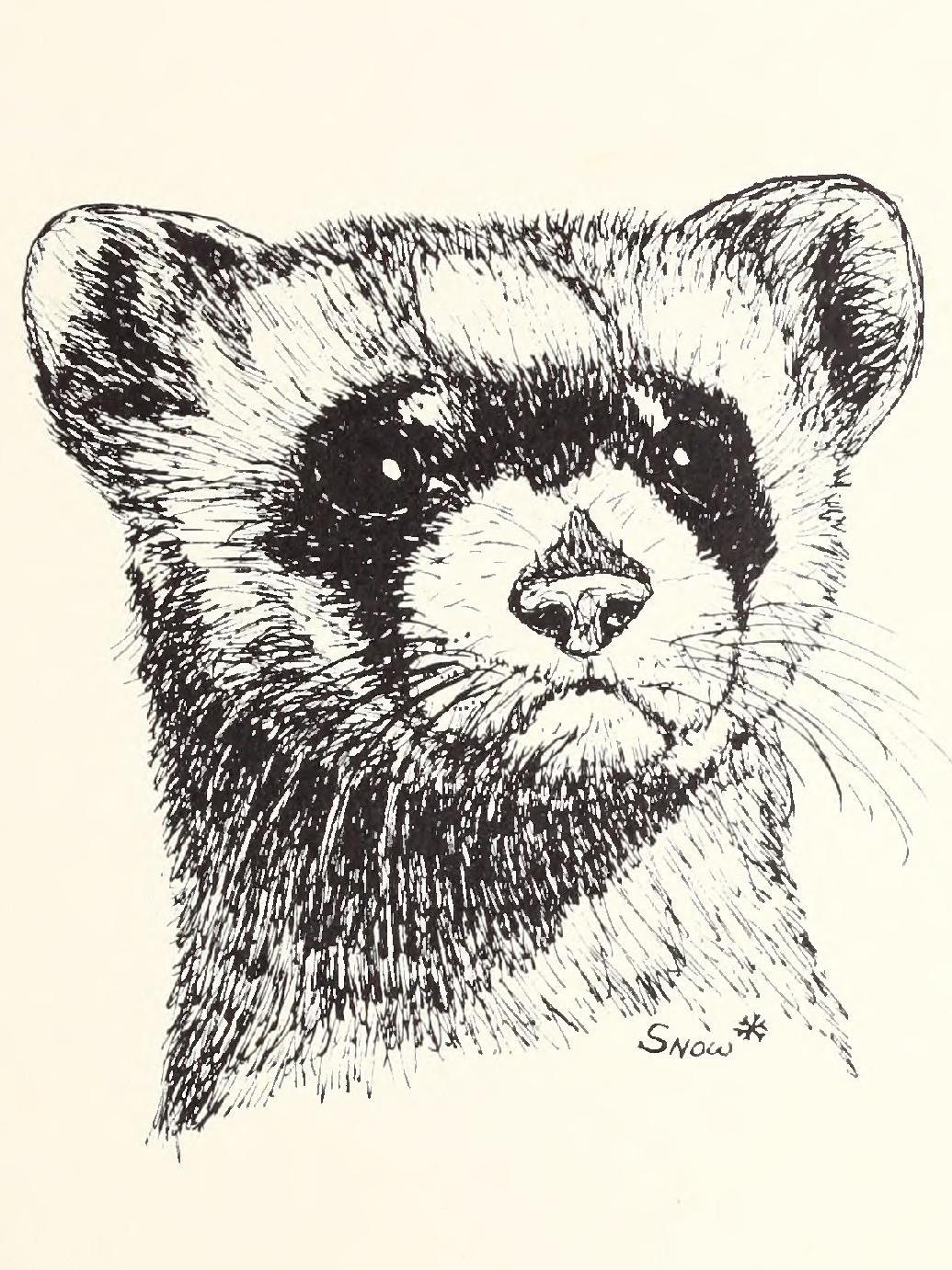
Head of a black-footed ferret by Carol Snow, 1972

The historical range of the black-footed ferret was closely correlated with, but not restricted to, the range of prairie dogs (Cynomys spp.). Its range extended from southern Alberta and southern Saskatchewan south to Texas, New Mexico, and Arizona. As of 2007, the only known wild black-footed ferret population was located on approximately 6,000 acres (2,400 hectares) in the western Big Horn Basin near Meeteetse, Wyoming. Since 1990, black-footed ferrets have been reintroduced to the following sites: Shirley Basin, Wyoming; UL Bend National Wildlife Refuge and Fort Belknap Indian Reservation, Montana; Conata Basin/Badlands, Buffalo Gap National Grassland, Wind Cave National Park and the Cheyenne River Sioux Reservation in South Dakota; Aubrey Valley, Arizona; Rocky Mountain Arsenal National Wildlife Refuge and Wolf Creek in Colorado; Coyote Basin, straddling Colorado and Utah, northern Chihuahua, Mexico, and Grasslands National Park, Canada.

Historical habitats of the black-footed ferret included shortgrass prairie, mixed-grass prairie, desert grassland, shrub steppe, sagebrush steppe, mountain grassland, and semi-arid grassland. Black-footed ferrets use prairie dog burrows for raising young, avoiding predators, and thermal cover. Six black-footed ferret nests found near Mellette County, South Dakota, were lined with buffalo grass, prairie threeawn, sixweeks grass, and cheatgrass. High densities of prairie dog burrows provide the greatest amount of cover for black-footed ferrets. Black-tailed prairie dog colonies contain a greater burrow density per acre than white-tailed prairie dog colonies, and may be more suitable for the recovery of black-footed ferrets. The type of prairie dog burrow may be important for occupancy by black-footed ferrets. Black-footed ferret litters near Meeteetse, Wyoming, were associated with mounded white-tailed prairie dog burrows, which are less common than non-mounded burrows. Mounded burrows contain multiple entrances and probably have a deep and extensive burrow system that protects kits. However, black-footed ferrets used non-mounded prairie dog burrows (64%) more often than mounded burrows (30%) near Meeteetse, Wyoming.

== Mortality ==
Primary causes of mortality include habitat loss, human-introduced diseases, and indirect poisoning from prairie dog control measures. Annual mortality of juvenile and adult black-footed ferrets over a 4-year period ranged from 59 to 83% (128 individuals) near Meeteetse, Wyoming. During fall and winter, 50–70% of juveniles and older animals perish. Average lifespan in the wild is probably only one year, but may be up to five years. Males have higher rates of mortality than females because of longer dispersal distances when they are most vulnerable to predators.

Given an obligate dependence of black-footed ferrets on prairie dogs, black-footed ferrets are extremely vulnerable to prairie dog habitat loss. Habitat loss results from agriculture, livestock use, and other development.

Black-footed ferrets are susceptible to numerous diseases. They are fatally susceptible to canine distemper virus, introduced by striped skunks, common raccoons, red foxes, coyotes, and American badgers. A short-term vaccine for canine distemper is available for captive black-footed ferrets, but no protection is available for young born in the wild. Black-footed ferrets are also susceptible to rabies, tularemia, and human influenza. They can directly contract sylvatic plague (Yersinia pestis), and epidemics in prairie dog towns may completely destroy the ferrets' prey base.

Predators of black-footed ferrets include great horned owls, golden eagles, coyotes, prairie falcons, ferruginous hawks, American badgers, and possibly prairie rattlesnakes and bobcats.

Oil and natural gas exploration and extraction can have detrimental impacts on prairie dogs and black-footed ferrets. Seismic activity collapses prairie dog burrows. Other problems include potential leaks and spills, increased roads and fences, increased vehicle traffic and human presence, and an increased number of raptor perching sites on power poles. Traps set for coyotes, American mink, and other animals may harm black-footed ferrets.

== History ==
Native American tribes, including the Crow, Blackfoot, Sioux, Cheyenne, and Pawnee, used black-footed ferrets for religious rites and for food. The species was not encountered during the Lewis and Clark Expedition, nor was it seen by Nuttall or Townsend, and it did not become known to modern science until it was first described in John James Audubon and John Bachman's Viviparous Quadrupeds of North America in 1851.

It is with great pleasure that we introduce this handsome new species; ... [it] inhabits the wooded parts of the country to the Rocky Mountains, and perhaps is found beyond that range... When we consider the very rapid manner in which every expedition that has crossed the Rocky Mountains, has been pushed forward, we cannot wonder that many species have been entirely overlooked... The habits of this species resemble, as far as we have learned, those of [the European polecat]. It feeds on birds, small reptiles and animals, eggs, and various insects, and is a bold and cunning foe to the rabbits, hares, grouse, and other game of our western regions.

— Audubon and Bachman (1851)

=== Decline ===
For a time, the black-footed ferret was harvested for the fur trade, with the American Fur Company having received 86 ferret skins from Pratt, Chouteau, and Company of St. Louis in the late 1830s. During the early years of predator control, black-footed ferret carcasses were likely discarded, as their fur was of low value. This likely continued after the passing of the Endangered Species Act of 1973, for fear of reprisals. The large drop in black-footed ferret numbers began during the 1800s through to the 1900s, as prairie dog numbers declined because of control programs and the conversion of prairies to croplands.

Sylvatic plague, a disease caused by Yersinia pestis introduced into North America, also contributed to the prairie dog die-off, though ferret numbers declined proportionately more than their prey, thus indicating other factors may have been responsible. Plague was first detected in South Dakota in a coyote in 2004, and then in about 50,000 acres (20,000 ha) of prairie dogs on Pine Ridge Reservation in 2005. Thereafter 7,000 acres (2,800 ha) of prairie dog colonies were treated with insecticide (DeltaDust) and 1,000 acres (400 ha) of black-footed ferret habitat were prophylactically dusted in Conata Basin in 2006–2007. Nevertheless, plague was proven in ferrets in May 2008. Since then each year 12,000 acres (4,900 ha) of their Conata Basin habitat is dusted and about 50–150 ferrets are immunized with plague vaccine. Ferrets are unlikely to persist through plague episodes unless there are management efforts that allow access to prey resources at a wider region or actions that could substantially reduce the plague transmission. A 2023 study found that combining insecticide dusting with aerial distribution of oral vaccine baits improved plague resistance in prairie dogs which supports black-footed ferret recovery. The authors emphasized that coordinated, landscape-scale mitigation is essential for maintaining stable prey populations and suitable ferret habitat. Long-term monitoring and integrated management strategies are key to sustaining conservation outcomes in plague-affected regions.

Inbreeding depression may have also contributed to the decline, as studies on black-footed ferrets from Meeteetse, Wyoming, revealed low levels of genetic variation. Canine distemper devastated the Meeteetse ferret population in 1985. A live virus vaccine originally made for domestic ferrets killed large numbers of black-footed ferrets, thus indicating that the species is especially susceptible to distemper.

=== Reintroduction and conservation ===
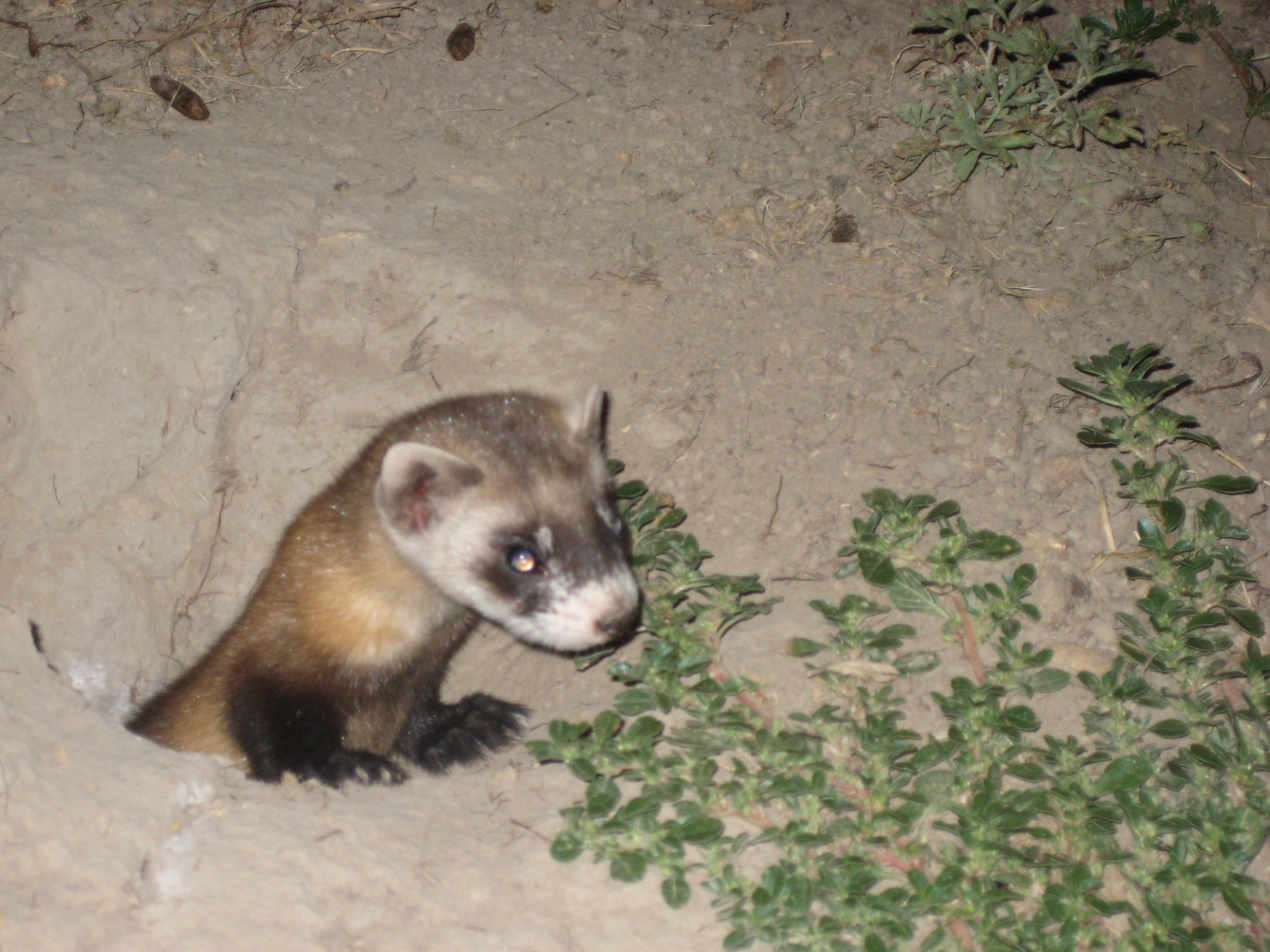
Ferret in the wild, July 2008, Conata Basin, South Dakota

The black-footed ferret experienced a recent population bottleneck in the wild followed by a more than 30-year recovery through ex situ breeding and then reintroduction into its native range. As such, this sole endemic North American ferret allows examining the impact of a severe genetic restriction on subsequent biological form and function, especially on reproductive traits and success. The black-footed ferret was listed as endangered by the United States Fish and Wildlife Service (USFWS) in 1967. Declared extinct in 1979, a residual wild population was discovered in Meeteetse, Wyoming, in 1981. This cohort eventually grew to 130 individuals and was then nearly extirpated by sylvatic plague, Yersinia pestis, and canine distemper virus, Canine morbillivirus, with eventually 18 animals remaining. These survivors were captured from 1985 to 1987 to serve as the foundation for the black-footed ferret ex situ breeding program. Seven of those 18 animals produced offspring that survived and reproduced, and with currently living descendants, are the ancestors of all black-footed ferrets now in the ex situ (about 320) and in situ (about 300) populations.

The black-footed ferret is an example of a species that benefits from strong reproductive science. A captive-breeding program was initiated in 1987, capturing 18 living individuals and using artificial insemination. This is one of the first examples of assisted reproduction contributing to conservation of an endangered species in nature. The U.S. Fish and Wildlife Service, state and tribal agencies, private landowners, conservation groups, and North American zoos have actively reintroduced ferrets back into the wild since 1991. Beginning in Shirley Basin in Eastern Wyoming, reintroduction expanded to Montana, six sites in South Dakota in 1994, Arizona, Utah, Colorado, Saskatchewan, Canada and Chihuahua, Mexico. The Toronto Zoo has bred hundreds, most of which were released into the wild. Several episodes of Zoo Diaries show aspects of the tightly controlled breeding. In May 2000, the Canadian Species at Risk Act listed the black-footed ferret as being an extirpated species in Canada. A population of 35 animals was released into Grasslands National Park in southern Saskatchewan on October 2, 2009, and a litter of newborn kits was observed in July 2010. Reintroduction sites have experienced multiple years of reproduction from released individuals.

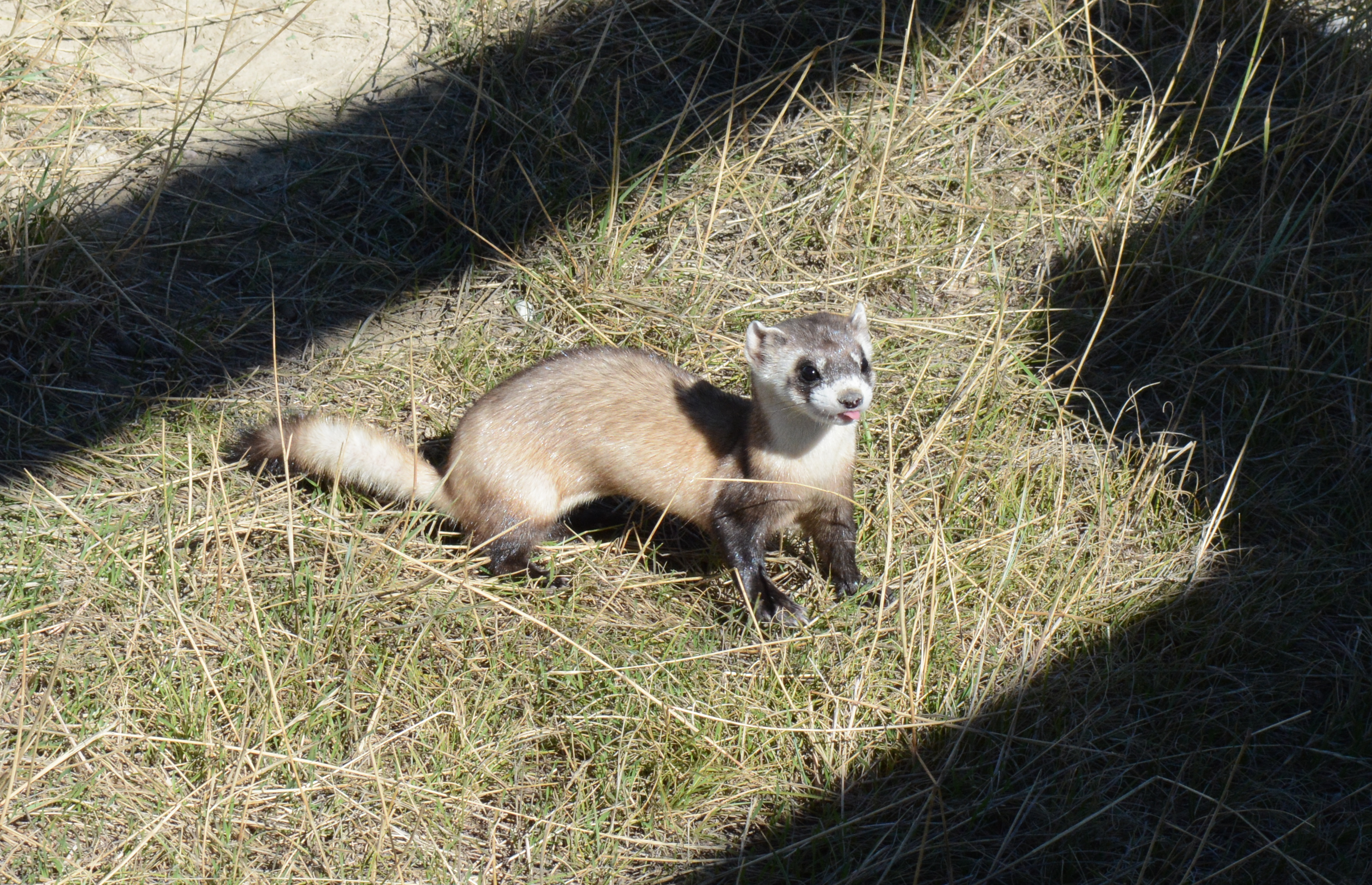
Ferret kit at the National Black-footed Ferret Conservation Center in Colorado

The black-footed ferret was first listed as endangered in 1967 under the Endangered Species Preservation Act, and was re-listed on January 4, 1974, under the Endangered Species Act. In September 2006, South Dakota's ferret population was estimated to be around 420, with 250 (100 breeding adults consisting of 67 females and 33 males) in Eagle Butte, South Dakota, which is 100,000 acres (40,000 ha), less than 3% of the public grasslands in South Dakota, 70 miles (110 km) east of Rapid City, South Dakota, in the Buffalo Gap National Grassland bordering Badlands National Park, 130 ferrets northeast of Eagle Butte, South Dakota, on Cheyenne River Indian Reservation, and about 40 ferrets on the Rosebud Indian Reservation. Arizona's Aubrey Valley ferret population was well over 100 and a second reintroduction site with around 50 animals is used. An August 2007 report in the journal Science counted a population of 223 in one area of Wyoming (the original number of reintroduced ferrets, most of which died, was 228), and an annual growth rate of 35% from 2003 to 2006 was estimated. This rate of recovery is much faster than for many endangered species, and the ferret seems to have prevailed over the previous problems of disease and prey shortage that hampered its improvement. As of 2007, the total wild population of black-footed ferrets in the U.S. was well over 650 individuals, plus 250 in captivity. In 2008, the IUCN reclassified the species as "globally endangered", a substantial improvement since the 1996 assessment, when it was considered extinct in the wild, as the species was indeed only surviving in captivity. In 2016, NatureServe considered the species Critically Imperiled.

As of 2013, about 1,200 ferrets are thought to live in the wild. These wild populations are possible due to the extensive breeding program that releases surplus animals to reintroduction sites, which are then monitored by USFWS biologists for health and growth. However, the species cannot depend just on ex situ breeding for future survival, as reproductive traits such as pregnancy rate and normal sperm motility and morphology have been steadily declining with time in captivity. These declining markers of individual and population health are thought to be due to increased inbreeding, an occurrence often found with small populations or ones that spend a long time in captivity.

Conservation efforts have been opposed by stock growers and ranchers, who have traditionally fought prairie dogs. In 2005, the U.S. Forest Service began poisoning prairie dogs in private land buffer zones of the Conata Basin of Buffalo Gap National Grassland. Because 10–15 ranchers complained the measure was inadequate, the forest service advised by Mark Rey, then Undersecretary of Agriculture, expanded its "prairie-dog management" in September 2006 to all of South Dakota's Buffalo Gap and the Fort Pierre National Grassland, and also to the Oglala National Grassland in Nebraska, against opinions of biologists in the U.S. Fish and Wildlife Service. Following exposure by conservation groups including the Climate, Community & Biodiversity Alliance and national media public outcry and a lawsuit mobilized federal officials, and the poisoning plan was revoked.

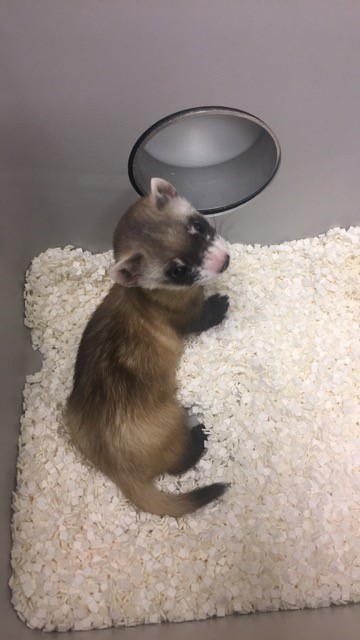
Elizabeth Ann, the first cloned black-footed ferret and first-ever cloned U.S. endangered species, 54 days old

The contradictory mandates of the two federal agencies involved, the USFWS and the U.S. Forest Service, are exemplified in what the Rosebud Sioux tribe experienced: The ferret was reintroduced by the USFWS, which according to the tribe promised to pay more than $1 million a year through 2010. On the other hand, the tribe was also contracted for the U.S. Forest Service prairie dog poisoning program. The increasing numbers of ferrets led to conflicts between the tribe's Cheyenne River Sioux Tribe Game, Fish and Parks Department and the Tribal Land Enterprise Organization. When the federal government started an investigation of the tribe's prairie dog management program, threatening to prosecute tribal employees or agents carrying out the management plan in the ferret reintroduction area, the tribal council passed a resolution in 2008, asking the two federal agencies to remove ferrets, and reimburse the tribe for its expenses for the ferret recovery program.

In 2020, black-footed ferrets were used to test an experimental COVID-19 vaccine in Colorado. COVID testing was performed on black-footed ferrets for crucial conservation reasons, primarily due to concerns that the highly endangered species would be vulnerable to the virus and face extinction from a potential outbreak. Ferrets are known to be susceptible to respiratory diseases, and the coronavirus spreads easily among related species, like mink.

Employees of the San Diego Zoo, the conservation organization Revive & Restore, the ViaGen Pets and Equine Company, and the U.S. Fish and Wildlife Service have teamed up to clone a black-footed ferret. In 2020, a team of scientists cloned a female named Willa, who died in the mid-1980s and left no living descendants. Her clone, a female named Elizabeth Ann, was born on December 10, 2020, making her the first North American endangered species to be cloned. Scientists hoped that the contribution of this individual would alleviate the effects of inbreeding and help black-footed ferrets better cope with plague. Experts estimate that this female's genome contains three times as much genetic diversity as any of the modern black-footed ferrets. In October 2022, Elizabeth Ann received a hysterectomy due to health complications related to hydrometra, a condition causing excessive fluid retention within the uterus, alongside an underdeveloped uterine horn. These conditions are common in black-footed ferrets, and are not believed to be due to the cloning process. Elizabeth Ann otherwise remained healthy and continues to demonstrate normal behavior for an adult ferret.

In April 2024, the U.S. Fish and Wildlife Service announced the birth of two new black-footed ferret clones, Noreen and Antonia, who were cloned from the same genetic material as Elizabeth Ann. Noreen was born at the National Black-footed Ferret Conservation Center in Colorado, while Antonia was born at the Smithsonian National Zoo & Conservation Biology Institute in Virginia. In June 2024, Antonia gave birth to a litter of three kits after mating with a male named Urchin. Two of these, a male named Red Cloud and a female named Sibert, survived in good health. In 2025, additional litters were produced by Antonia, Sibert, and Red Cloud at the Smithsonian Conservation Biology Institute, with a fourth by Noreen at the National Black-footed Ferret Conservation Center. Elizabeth Ann and Noreen also died in this year.

== In popular culture ==
In 2023, the black-footed ferret was featured on a United States Postal Service Forever stamp as part of the Endangered Species set, based on a photograph from Joel Sartore's Photo Ark. The stamp was dedicated at a ceremony at the National Grasslands Visitor Center in Wall, South Dakota. The U.S. Census Bureau featured a black-footed ferret on its "Data Federated Electronic Research Review Extraction and Tabulation Tool" or "Data FERRETT" web tool. This tool allowed researchers outside the government to extract unique, anonymized data from respondents to Census surveys, including the Current Population Survey.
