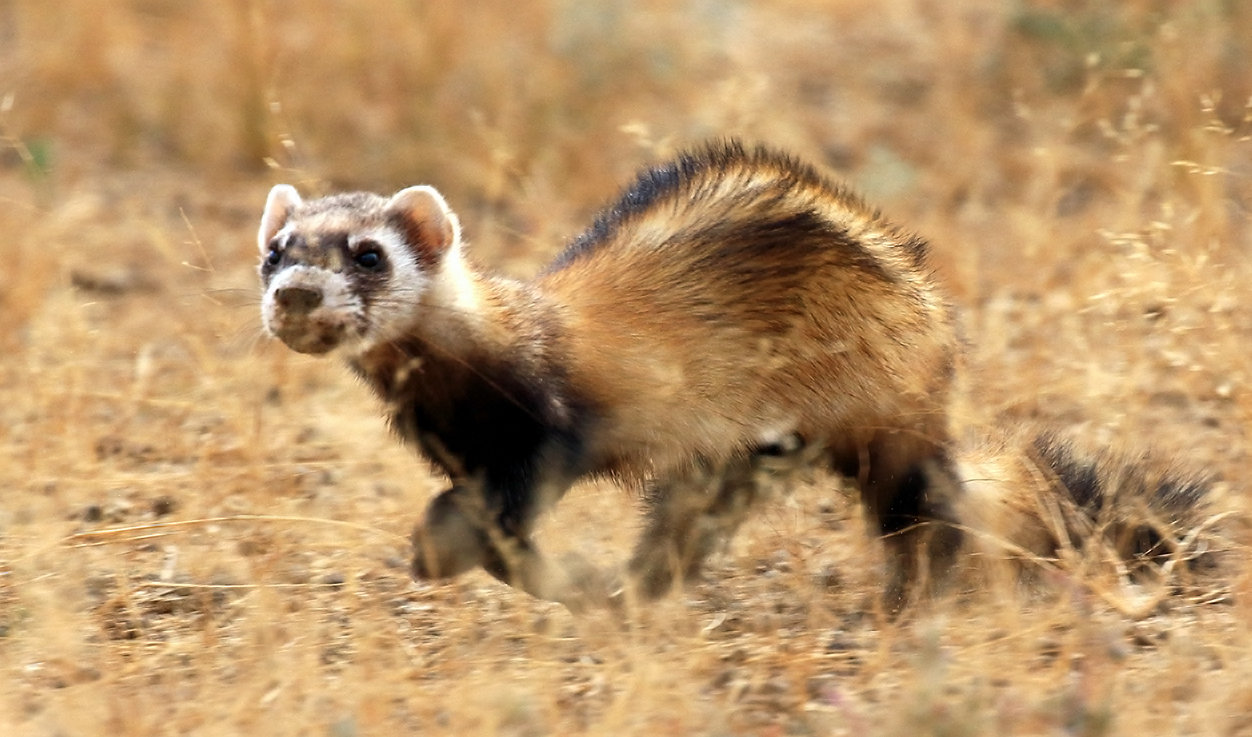
- At the Stepnoi Sanctuary

Conservation status
- Least Concern (IUCN 3.1)

Scientific classification
- Kingdom: Animalia
- Phylum: Chordata
- Class: Mammalia
- Order: Carnivora
- Family: Mustelidae
- Genus: Mustela
- Subgenus: Putorius
- Species: M. eversmanii

Binomial name
- Mustela eversmanii (Lesson, 1827)
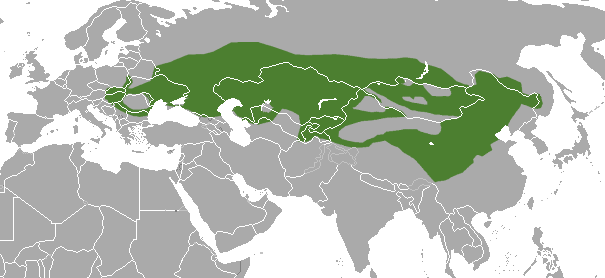
- Steppe polecat range

= Steppe polecat =

Species of carnivore

The steppe polecat (Mustela eversmanii), also known as the white or masked polecat, is a species of mustelid native to Central and Eastern Europe and Central and East Asia. It is listed as Least Concern on the IUCN Red List because of its wide distribution, occurrence in a number of protected areas, and tolerance to some degree of habitat modification. It is generally of a very light yellowish colour, with dark limbs and a dark mask across the face. Compared to its relative, the European polecat, the steppe polecat is larger in size and has a more powerfully built skull.

The steppe polecat is a nomadic animal which typically only settles in one area until its prey, mainly ground squirrels, are extirpated. It mates from March to May, and generally gives birth to litters of three to six kits, which attain their full growth at the age of two years. It hunts for larger prey than the European polecat, including pikas and marmots.

== Evolution ==
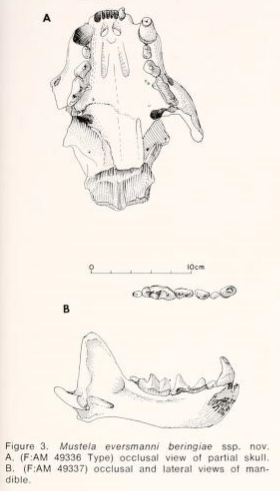
Skull and jaw of the extinct Mustela eversmanii beringiae

The earliest true polecat was Mustela stromeri, which appeared during the late Villafranchian. It was considerably smaller than the present form, thus indicating polecats evolved at a relatively late period. The steppe polecat's closest relatives are the European polecat and black-footed ferret, with which it is thought to have shared Mustela stromeri as a common ancestor. The steppe polecat likely diverged from the European polecat 1.5 million years ago based on IRBP, though cytochrome b transversions indicate a younger date of 430,000 years. As a species, the steppe polecat represents a more specialised form than the European polecat in the direction of carnivory, being more adapted to preying on larger rodent species; its skull has a stronger dentition, its projections are more strongly developed and its muscles of mastication are more powerful. The steppe polecat's growth rate is also much slower than the European polecat's, as its skull undergoes further development at an age when the European polecat has attained full growth. The species may have once been present in Pleistocene central Alaska.

Fossilised remains of the steppe polecat were found in the Pleistocene sites of La Terrasse and Aven des Planes in France.

== Taxonomy ==
As of 2005, seven living subspecies are recognized.

| Subspecies | Trinomial authority | Description | Range | Synonyms |
|---|---|---|---|---|
| Petropavlov steppe polecat M. e. eversmanii (Nominate subspecies) | Lesson, 1827 | A moderately-sized subspecies with dense, soft winter fur, the general tone of the fur is pale, straw-whitish, with white underfur. The guard hairs on the hindquarters are lighter than in other subspecies. | Trans-Volzhsky, western Siberia east to Irkutsk Oblast and south to the Cis-Altai steppes, Pri-Balkhash, the plains portion of Semirechye, and northern, western and eastern Kazakhstan outside the former Soviet Union; it may occur in parts of China contiguous with eastern Kazakhstan; it possibly occurs in the part of China contiguous with eastern Kazakhstan. | aureus (Pocock, 1936), heptapotamicus (Stroganov, 1960), nobilis (Stroganov, 1958), pallidus (Stroganov, 1958) |
| Chinese steppe polecat M. e. admirata | Pocock, 1936 | | Hebei, Shaanxi and Ordos | |
| Amur steppe polecat M. e. amurensis | Ognev, 1930 | This is a moderately-sized subspecies with short, dense and soft fur. The general colour of the back is bright reddish-ochreous, almost without dark tones. | The left bank of the middle River Amur, eastern former Manchuria and possibly farther south | |
| European steppe polecat M. e. hungarica | Éhik, 1928 | A small subspecies with sparse and coarse fur, its fur colour is the darkest among steppe polecats, being relatively dark-brownish with yellowish underfur and dark, tawny frosting. | Westernmost European Russia, northwards to the northern limit of Russia; eastwards, probably to the Volga and the northern Caucasus, outside the former Soviet Union; its range encompasses the former Czechoslovakia, Austria, Hungary, the northeastern former Yugoslavia, northern Bulgaria, Romania and apparently in a small section of Poland at its boundary with Lviv | moravica (Kostron, 1948), occidentalis (Brauner, 1929), satunini (Migulin, 1928) |
| Tibetan steppe polecat M. e. larvatus | Hodgson, 1849 | A poorly understood form, likely of large size | Tibet and Kashmir | tibetanus (Horsfield, 1851) |
| Baikal steppe polecat M. e. michnoi | Kastschenko, 1910 | A very large subspecies with very long, coarse winter fur and long, shaggy guard hairs, it is of a whitish colour, with black guard hairs and sometimes a light reddish fur. | Cis-Baikalia in the west up to the range of M. e. eversmanii in the east, Transbaikalia, Tuva, and the montane parts of the Altai Krai; formerly Manchuria, Mongolia and possibly the northern parts of Inner Mongolia and some eastern parts of Dzungaria | dauricus (Stroganov, 1958), lineiventer (Hollister, 1913), sibiricus (Kastschenko, 1912), triarata (Hollister, 1913), tuvinicus (Stroganov, 1958) |
| Turkestan steppe polecat M. e. talassicus | Ognev, 1928 | A small subspecies with long, dense, but coarse winter fur; the general tone of its fur is very pale whitish, lacking any rusty tone. The underfur is slightly yellowish, the guard hairs are black and the facial mask is barely noticeable. | Between the Caspian Sea and Lake Balkhash, the western borders of the Tian Shan, southern Kazakhstan, Uzbekistan, Tajikistan and Turkmenistan | |

== Description ==
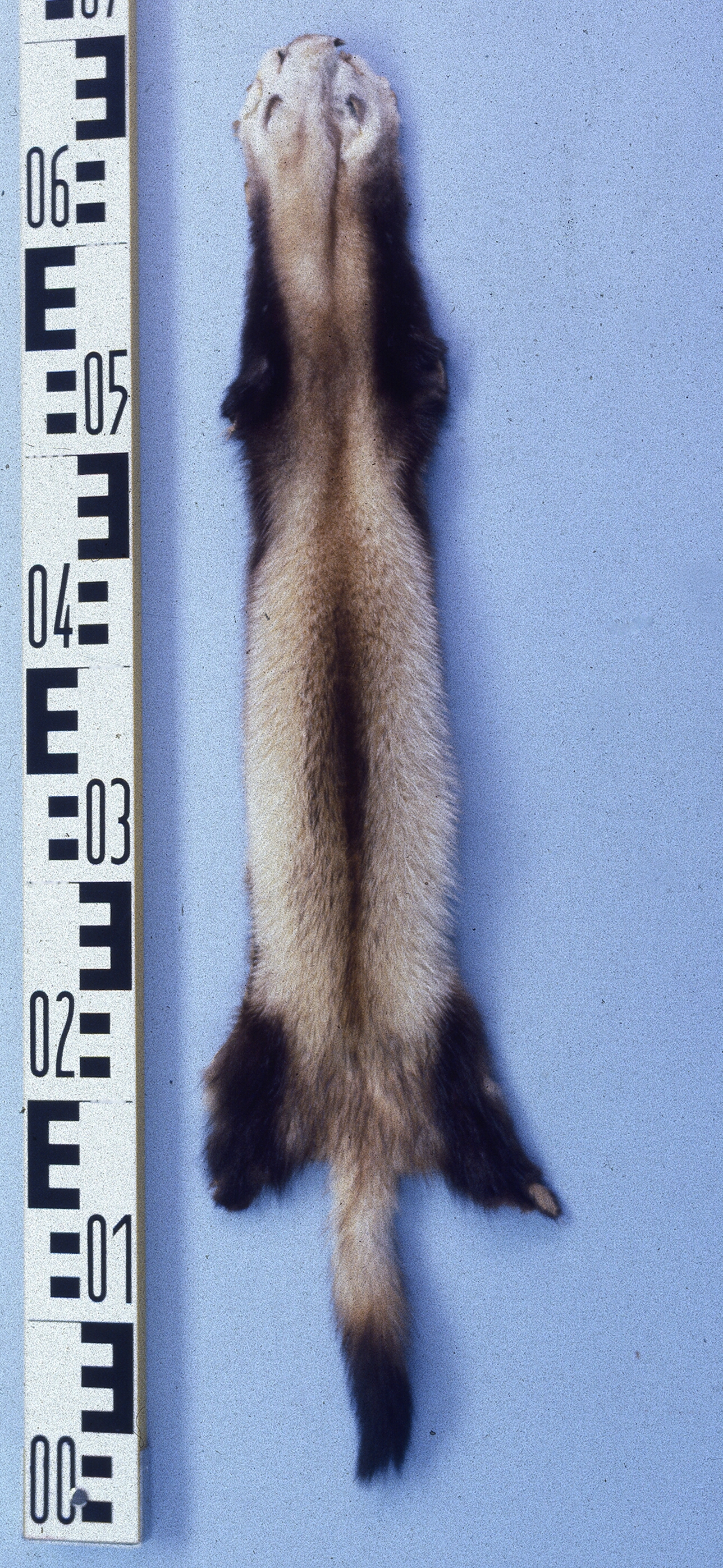
Pelt

The steppe polecat is very close to the European polecat in general appearance, proportions and habits, though its body seems somewhat more elongated, due to its shorter guard hairs. The tail is short, constituting a third of its body length. The skull is heavier and more massive than that of the European polecat, having more widely spaced zygomatic arches and more strongly developed projections, particularly the sagittal crest. It greatly resembles the black-footed ferret of North America, with the only noticeable differences between them being the steppe polecat's much longer and softer fur, shorter ears, and shorter postmolar extension of the palate. It has four pairs of teats and well-developed anal glands, which can produce a sharp-smelling liquid which is sprayed in self-defence. Males measure 320–562 mm (12.6–22.1 in) in body length, while females measure 290–520 mm (11–20 in). Tail length of males is 80–183 mm (3.1–7.2 in) and 70–180 mm (2.8–7.1 in) for females. Males in Siberia may weigh up to 2.0 kg (4.5 lbs.), while females weigh 1.4 kg (3.0 lbs.). One giant polecat from Semirechye had a body length of about 775 mm (30.5 in). Overall, specimens exhibiting gigantism are more common than in the European polecat, and occur primarily in western Siberia, where they likely hybridise with Siberian weasels.

The winter fur is soft and tall, with short, dense underfur and long, sparse guard hairs. The fur is generally shorter and not as thick as that of the European polecat. The guard hairs are especially well developed on the lower back, though still sparser than those of the European polecat. Contrary to the former, the steppe polecat's guard hairs never completely cover the underfur. The base colour of the winter fur is very light yellowish or whitish-yellowish. The tips of the guard hairs are blackish-brown or brown, forming a frosting effect over the yellow underfur. This frosting is stronger in the middle and lower back, where the guard hairs are denser and longer. The guard hairs on the upper back, the flanks, between the shoulders and along the upper neck are extremely short, thus being lighter in colour than the posterior region. The head is piebald, with the eye region and the upper side of the nose being covered by a brownish mask. Behind the mask, a white band crosses the head from cheek to cheek. A small brownish area is usually located in front of each ear. The ears are completely white, while the throat is yellowish-white or almost white. Sometimes, the head is entirely white. The lower surface of the neck is dark blackish-brown or brown, while the chest and forelegs are black or blackish-brown. The abdomen is light, yellowish-straw in colour. The groin is the same colour of the forelimbs. The base of the tail is light in colour, while the tip is dark brown. The summer coat is shorter and coarser than the winter fur, and is not as dense and close-fitting, with a more strongly developed ochreous or reddish tone. The head is, overall, darker than in winter, with greater contrast between the dark and white tones.

== Distribution and habitat ==
The steppe polecat occurs from Central and Eastern Europe in the west through southern Russia, northern Georgia, Kazakhstan, Turkmenistan, Uzbekistan, Tajikistan, and Kyrgyzstan to Mongolia and northern and western China. In 2014, it has been recorded at an elevation of 5,050 m (16,570 ft) in Upper Mustang, Annapurna Conservation Area, Nepal.

== Behaviour and ecology ==
=== Territorial and sheltering behaviours ===
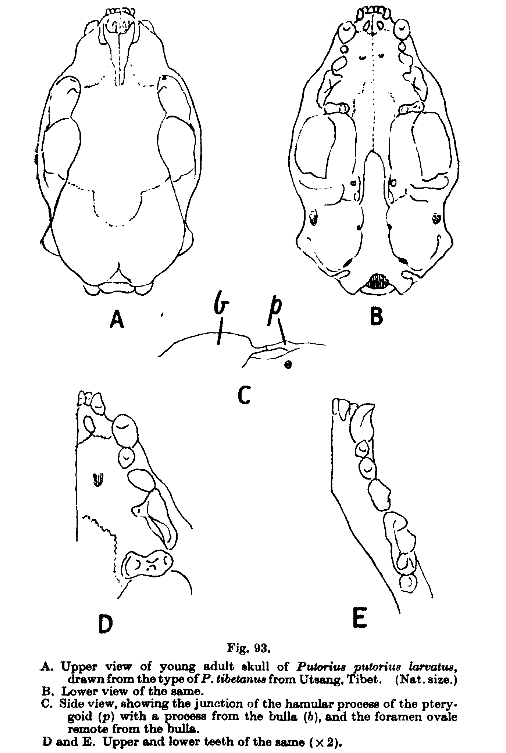
Skull and dentition, as illustrated in Pocock's The Fauna of British India, including Ceylon and Burma - Mammalia Vol 2

The steppe polecat does not hold sharply defined home ranges. During warm seasons, especially in areas rich in ground squirrels, aged polecats hold relatively stable territories until they have extirpated their prey. Younger polecats are less sedentary, and will sleep overnight in the burrows of ground squirrels they have killed. Females nursing their litters are the most settled, but will begin roaming once the kits are old enough to accompany them. Generally, the steppe polecat only occupies one home range for a few days or up to a few months. In winter, the steppe polecat is more active and moves 12–18 km (7.5–11.2 mi) a day. During heavy snowfall, the steppe polecat migrates to more favourable areas, such as along the slopes of steppe ravines, near settlements and winter encampments.

The species does not usually dig its own burrow, instead using those of marmots, ground squirrels, hamsters, moles, voles, jerboas and others, after slightly widening them. Its burrow is often poorly constructed, as it does not inhabit one long enough to warrant restructuring. Nesting burrows are not lined, and have many outlets, ranging from three to 20. Alongside the nest chamber is a food store. Independently dug burrows are typically shallow and simple in construction.

=== Reproduction and development ===
In captivity, mating was observed in early March till the end of the month. In the Moscow Zoo, seven cases were observed of polecats mating from 9 April till 9 June. Symptoms of estrus were noted on 12–13 March, and continued to develop for two to three weeks. After mating, these symptoms disappeared within three to four weeks. The mating season in western Siberia occurs in March, while in Transbaikalia it occurs to the end of May. Copulation lasts from 20 minutes to three hours. Estrus may last longer or be repeated should a female fail to produce a litter or if the litter dies prematurely. Typically, the steppe polecat mates once a year and produces one litter. The gestation period lasts from 36–43 days. Placentation occurs two weeks after mating, with the blastocyst stage lasting seven to eight days. Litters usually consist of three to six kits, though litters of 18 are known.

Kits are born blind and naked, with pale rose skin and a membrane over the ears. At birth, they measure 6.5–7 cm (2.6–2.8 in) in length and weigh 4.5 g (0.16 oz), though polecats born in the Moscow Zoo weighed 10 g (0.35 oz). Usually, the weight of newborn kits depends on litter size. A thin, white underfur appears on the body after three days, and the body length doubles, while the weight increases six-fold at up to 33 g (1.2 oz). Milk teeth erupt around the same time, and the feet begin to darken. On the 20th day, the kits darken in colour and weigh 70–72 g (2.5–2.5 oz). The eyes open after 28–34 days, and the kits become more active, to the point of attempting to tear apart prey whilst still relying on the mother's milk. At the age of one month, kits measure 190 mm (7.5 in) in length and weigh 138 g (4.9 oz). By the age of 45 days, they are able to hunt young ground squirrels, and begin to target adults at the age of 60 days. The kits remain in the family burrow for 2.0–2.5 months. The kits begin to disperse from July or later, and attain sexual maturity at the age of 10 months. They reach adulthood at the age of two years.

=== Diet ===
Unlike the European polecat, which feeds mostly on mouse-like rodents, the steppe polecat preys on larger, steppe-dwelling mammals such as ground squirrels, hamsters, pikas and young or injured adult marmots. Ground squirrels are its most frequent prey throughout the year; in warm periods, they are hunted on the surface, while in autumn they are excavated from their burrows. Male polecats often have to widen squirrel burrows to enter them, while young or female polecats can usually enter them easily. In areas where ground squirrels are absent, the steppe polecat feeds primarily on hamsters and pikas, or water voles on the banks of water bodies. Along the shores of rivers and lakes, fish, chickens and carrion may be prey. Birds occasionally killed by the steppe polecat include grey partridges and willow grouse. Amphibians and reptiles are rarely eaten.

== Diseases and parasites ==
The steppe polecat is weakly susceptible to sylvatic plague, tularemia and canine distemper. Weakened individuals are susceptible to pasteurellosis. Helminth infections, as well as tick infestations are widespread in the species. Up to 11 flea species are known to infest the steppe polecat, some of which are picked up from its prey.

== Relationships with humans ==
The steppe polecat is of great economic value to nations of the former Soviet Union. It kills large numbers of rodents harmful to agriculture and which spread disease; a single steppe polecat can destroy at least 200 ground squirrels a year or 1,500 mouse-like rodents in winter alone. It is also very important to the fur trade of the former Soviet Union. It holds first place among harvested furbearers in Kazakhstan and other regions. However, steppe polecat numbers dropped noticeably during 1926–1929 and 1956–1959. This decline was attributed to changes in steppe landscapes and a decrease in the species' natural prey in connection with the application of chemical methods in controlling rodent populations, the plowing of Virgin Lands and changes in agrochemical methods. The steppe polecat is fairly easy to harvest. It is primarily caught with jaw traps located near inhabited burrows.
