= Mark Rey =

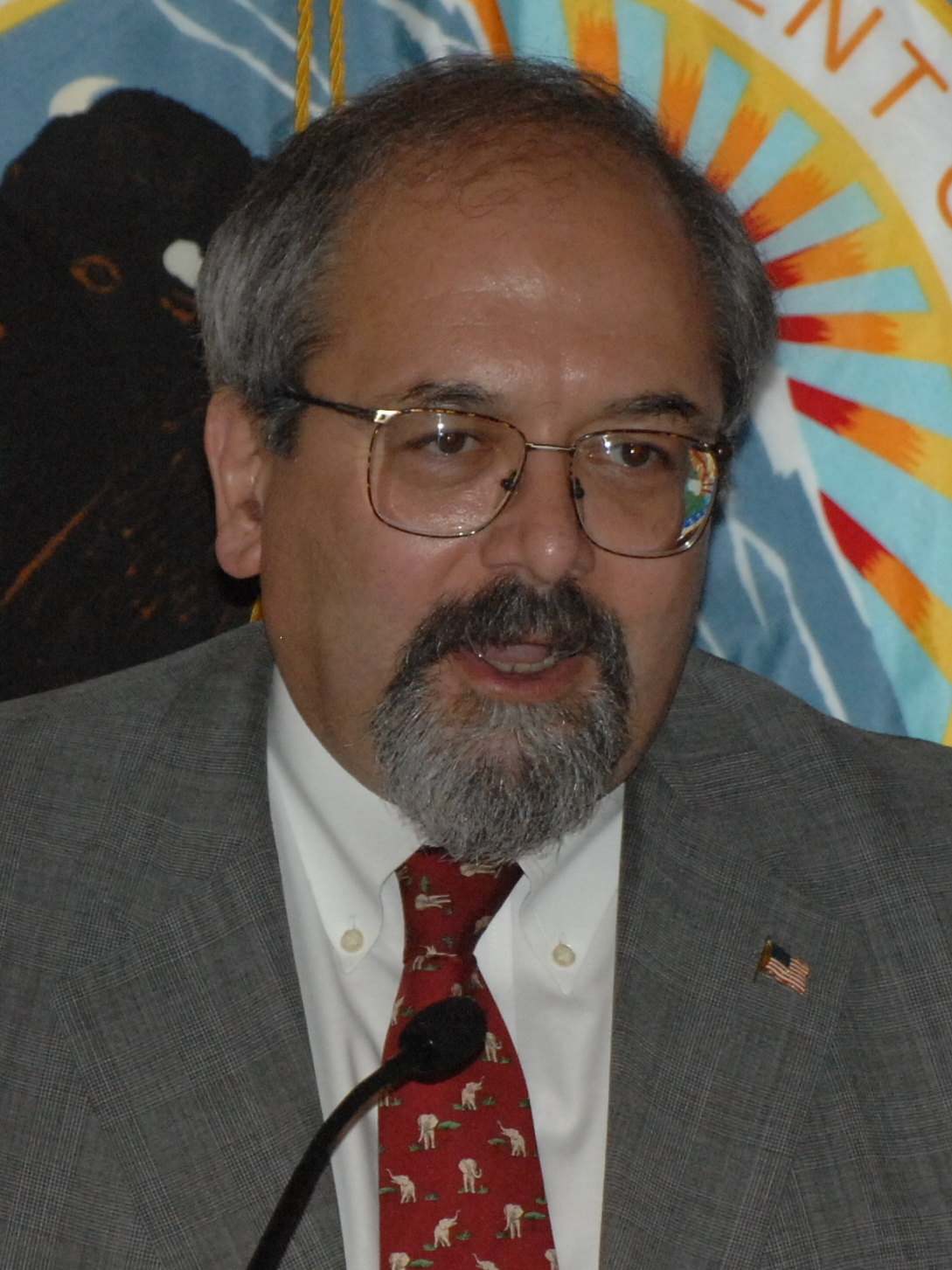
Rey in 2008

Mark Rey is an American former timber industry lobbyist and administrator, who served as Undersecretary for natural resources and agriculture in the federal government of the United States in the Bush administration. He was sworn in as the undersecretary for natural resources and environment by the Agriculture Secretary, Ann M. Veneman on 2 October 2001. His responsibility was to monitor the U.S. Department of Agriculture’s Forest Service and Natural Resource Conservation Service.

== Early life and education ==
Originally from Canton, Ohio, Rey has two Bachelor of Science degrees, in wildlife management and in forestry, and a Master of Science degree in natural resource policy and administration, all from the University of Michigan in Ann Arbor.

== Career ==
=== Timber industry ===
From 1976 to 1984 he held several roles within the American Paper Institute and National Forest Product Association. From 1984 until 1989 he was Vice President for Forest Programs of the National Forest Product Association. From 1989 he was Executive Director of the American Forest Resources Alliance, before becoming Vice President for Forest Resources for the American Forest and Paper Association in 1992.

=== Undersecretary ===
In 1994, Rey became Chief of Staff to Senator Larry Craig (R-Idaho). From 1995 to 2001 he served as a staff member with the United States Senate Committee on Energy and Natural Resources, as the committee’s lead staffer on national forest policy and United States Forest Service (USFS) Administration. In this position he was directly involved with almost all legislation dealing with the USFS, with particular responsibility for several public lands bills. He had a major role in the proposed 1997 revisions to the National Forest Management Act, which would have made timber harvest levels mandatory while rendering environmental standards unenforceable.

Rey was the key author of the 1995 "Salvage Rider" which was attached to the "must pass" congressional budget bill containing financial aid for victims of the Oklahoma City bombing. The "rider" suspended all environmental protections (such as the Endangered Species Act) allowing "salvage" harvests, which in many cases included logging of healthy green old-growth timber under the guise of protecting "forest health," in the Pacific Northwest.

From 1992 to 1994, as the Vice President of Forest Resources for the American Forest and Paper Association, he pushed to eliminate public appeals to the USFS decision-making process because he claimed it was being abused by environmental groups. Throughout his career, he has opposed setting aside reserves for endangered species, while advocating logging quotas for old-growth forests, the imposition of fees for recreational use, and limiting public participation Forest Service planning. In February 2008, Rey was threatened with jail by federal judge Donald Molloy of Missoula for contempt of court. Rey had been ordered to have the Forest Service evaluate the environmental impacts of air-dropped ammonium phosphate fire retardants that are known to harm fish. Rey initially refused to comply with the order, but agreed to cooperate only when faced with the prospect of prison time.

== Post-Undersecretarial Career ==
While continuing to work as a consulting lobbyist, Rey has taken up a career as a lecturer at Michigan State University since 2009. His teaching focuses on the field of natural resources policy. Rey has made use of connections obtained during his political career to facilitate the Demmer Scholars Program, a joint internship and class arrangement between University of Montana, Michigan State University and Mississippi State University. The program gives participating students work placements within federal natural resources agencies or non-governmental organizations (both nonprofit and for profit) operating in the natural resources policy arena in Washington, D.C.
