= Kazantyp Nature Reserve =

Protected area in Crimea

- Казантипский природный заповедник
- IUCN category Ia (strict nature reserve)
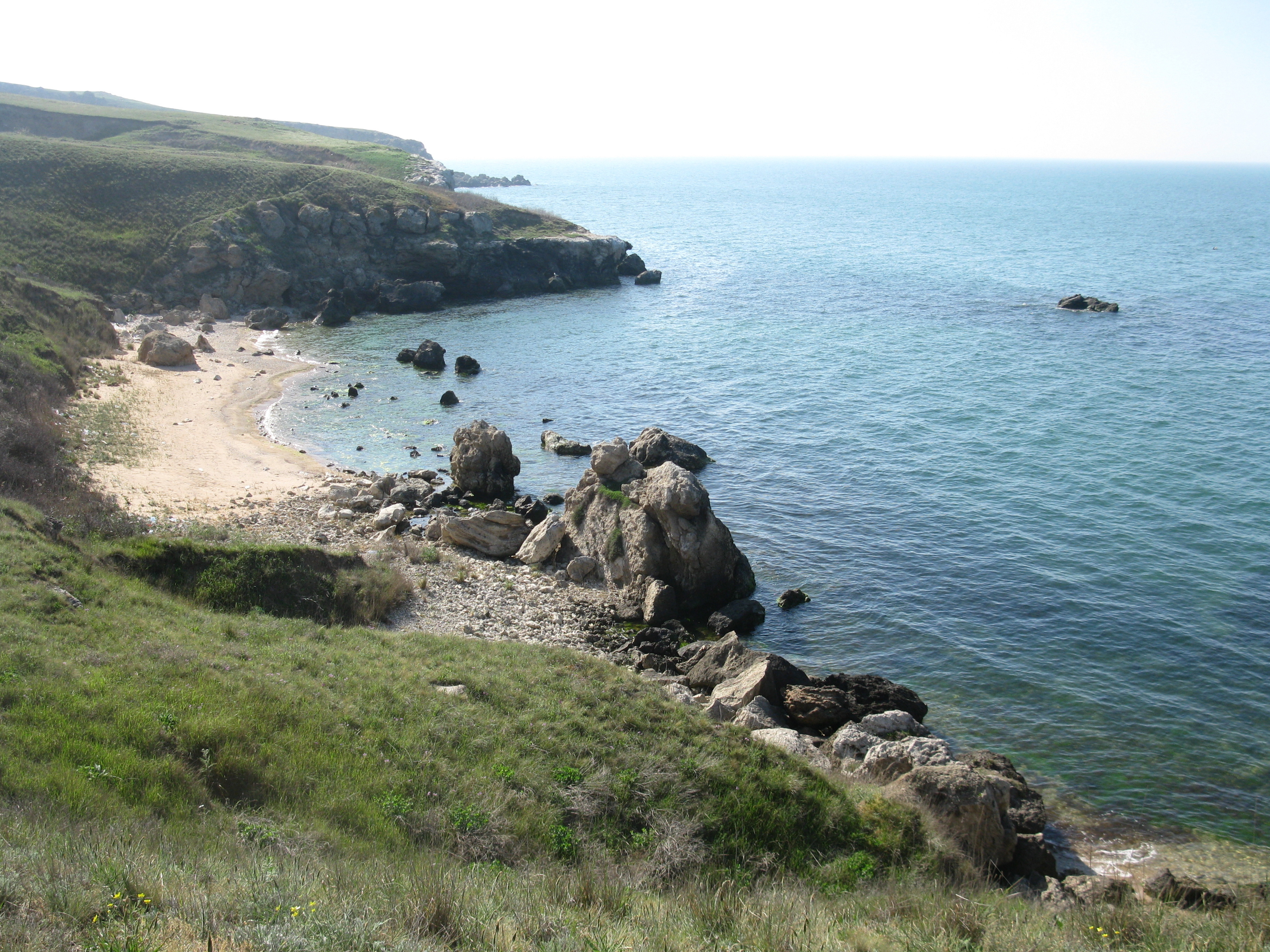
- Cove in Kazantyp Nature Reserve

- Location within Crimea
- Location: Kerch Peninsula, Crimea
- Coordinates: 45.4616°N 35.8434°E
- Area: 4.5 km^{2} (1.7 sq mi)
- Established: 1998

The Kazantyp Nature Reserve (Ukrainian: Казантипський природний заповідник; Russian: Казантипский природный заповедник, IPA: [kəzɐnˈtʲipskʲɪj prʲɪˈpodnɨj zəpɐˈtɕedʲnʲɪk]) is a small reserve (4.5 square kilometres (1.7 sq mi)) in the Lenine Raion on the Kerch Peninsula in Crimea. The reserve includes both territory of Cape Kazantyp and coast-aquatic-complex.

Kazantyp Nature Reserve was established in 1998. It is subordinated to the Ministry of Ecology and Natural Resources. The reserve protects the ecosystems of coastal area and also near coastal sea algae communities. The plant communities are mostly associated to the steppe type.

Despite its small size, the reserve includes 486 kinds of Crimean vascular plants and over one half of the plants of the Kerch peninsula. The fauna includes birds and off-shore species.

The reserve protects virgin ecosystems of coastal areas, including near-coastal sea algae communities. The plant communities are mostly associated with the steppe type.

Kazantyp Nature Reserve is listed among the 138 most valuable areas of Ukraine, defined for the Important Bird Area Programme. According to UNESCO, Cape Kazantуp is a reserve of international significance.

== Flora and fauna ==
=== Flora ===
Flora on the IUCN Red List

1. Allium pervestitum
2. Rumia crithmifolia
3. Alyssum calycocarpum
4. Papaver maeoticum
5. Agropyron cimmericum
6. Crataegus taurica

Flora on the European Red List

1. Rumia crithmifolia
2. Centaurea aemulans
3. Senecio borysthenicus
4. Tanacetum paczoskii
5. Alyssum calycocarpum
6. Crataegus taurica
7. Galium xeroticum
8. Solanum zelenetzkii

Flora listed in the Convention on the Conservation of European Wildlife and Natural Habitats

1. Crambe koktebelica
2. Zostera marina

Flora in the Red Book of Ukraine

Red Book of Ukraine:

1. Allium pervestitum
2. Astrodaucus littoralis
3. Asparagus brachyphyllus
4. Crambe koktebelica
5. Silene syreitschikowii
6. Silene viridiflora
7. Crocus pallasii
8. Orchis picta
9. Stipa brauneri
10. Stipa capillata
11. Stipa lessingiana
12. Stipa poetica
13. Stipa ucrainica

=== Fauna ===
Fauna listed in the Red Book of Ukraine

1. Rhinolophus ferrumequinum
2. Tursiops truncatus ponticus
3. Phocana phocana relicta
4. Mustela eversmanni
5. Tadorna ferruginea
6. Falco naumanni
7. Himantopus himantopus
8. Heamatopus ostralegus
9. Egretta garszetta
10. Aguila rapax
11. Ophisaurus apodus
12. Coluber jugularis
13. Elaphe quatuorlineata
14. Vipera ursini renardi

Fauna listed on the European Red List

1. Phocana phocana relicta
2. Falco naumanni

Fauna listed in the Convention on the Conservation of European Wildlife and Natural Habitats

1. Crocidura suaveolens
2. Pipistrellus pipistrellus
3. Tursiops truncatus ponticus
4. Phocana phocana relicta
5. Mustela eversmanni
6. Gulosus aristotelis
7. Tadorna ferruginea
8. Burhinus oedicnemus
9. Charadrius dubius
10. Casmerodius (Egretta) alba
11. Upupa epops
12. Bufo viridis
13. Ophisaurus apodus
14. Natrix tessellata
15. Vipera ursini renardi
