= Tarutyne steppe =

Landscape reserve in Odesa Oblast, Ukraine

- Ukrainian: Тарутинський степ
- IUCN category V (protected landscape/seascape)
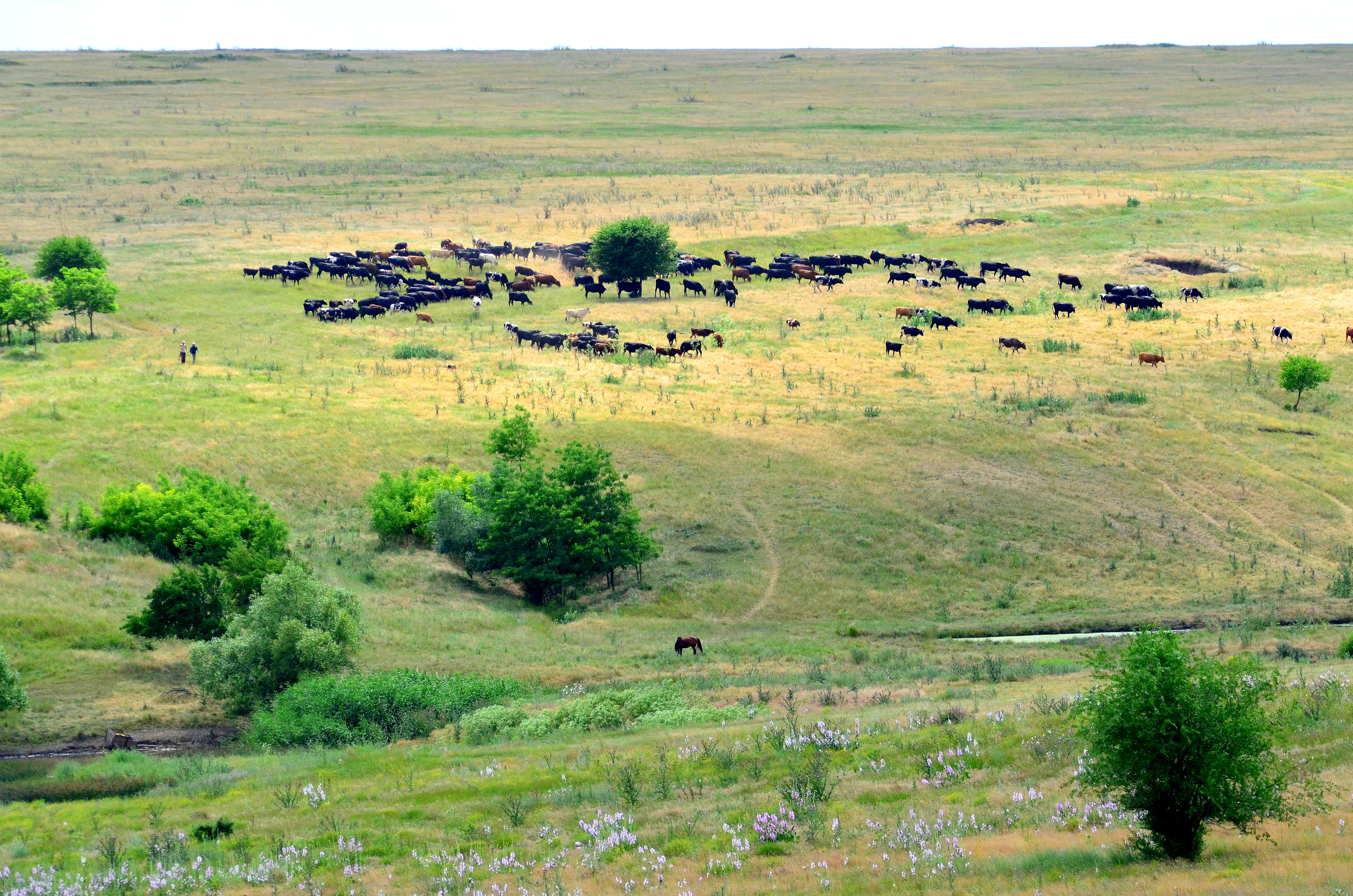
- Grazing cattle at Tarutyne steppe

- Location within Ukraine
- Location: Bolhrad Raion, Odesa Oblast, Ukraine
- Nearest city: Bessarabske
- Coordinates: 46°15′39″N 29°26′26″E
- Area: 5,200 ha (13,000 acres)

The Tarutyne steppe is a protected landscape reserve located in Bolhrad Raion, Odesa Oblast, Ukraine. It is one of the largest preserved steppe fragments in Ukraine, and of significant local importance.

== Location ==
The Tarutyne steppe is located within the Budjak Steppe in Odesa Oblast in the territory of Tarutyne settlement hromada. The total land area of the protected land is 5200 hectares. There are 4800 hectares of natural pasture and 400 hectares of wooded areas.

== Creation ==
The original proposal by the State Department, put forward in 2008, was for the creation of a park that could be used for public recreation. This was considered by the Tarutyne District Council on no fewer than three occasions, and finally rejected in 2010. The reasons given were twofold.

The Ministry of Defence objected due to the fact that the proposed area occupies part of the former Tarutyne military range, created in 1946, a total area of 24,521 hectares. Residents of several villages of the district were evicted from these lands. Military exercises were conducted here, and grazing and mowing was stopped. In the late 1990s the intensity of use of the range by the military gradually decreased, and in 2005 the range was abandoned. However, the dispute remained between the district administration and The Ministry of Defence of Ukraine for the right to dispose of the lands.

And secondly, part of the area was also reclaimed landfill, and deemed too dangerous for public use.

The proposal was then modified from a landscape park to a preserve. After that, in 2011, the Tarutyne District Council and district administration agreed to create such a preserve. The landscape preserve "Tarutyne steppe" was announced by decree № 445-VI during the 12th session of the Odesa Regional Council of People's Deputies of the Sixth Convocation (26 of April, 2012). It was signed by the village council, the district administration of Odesa Oblast, and the State Department of Environmental Protection in the Odesa Oblast.

== Value ==
Ironically, it was the former military range, with the large protected zone used for grazing, which created conditions similar to the natural steppe ecosystem requirements - over 100 years of moderate grazing pressure and lack of plowing.

The main values of the preserve are ecosystems of forb-fescue-feather grass and fescue-feather grass, typical of virgin and secondary steppe. Here, Stipa capillata, Stipa lessingiana and rarely other feather grass species dominate. Among animals which occur here, over 40 species are listed in the Red Book of Ukraine. The steppe plays an important role for the preservation of many rare species of steppe birds. Also, the territory is important for the southern birch mouse. Its population in "Tarutyne steppe" landscape preserve is one of the last population which has been preserved in Ukraine.

The preserve is nominated as the object of the Emerald Network and is included in the Emerald Network database by a Berne Convention on the Conservation of European Wildlife and Natural Habitats Secretariat.

== Flora and fauna ==
A significant floristic and faunal diversity is a characteristic of the preserve. Below is a list of wildlife and flora which exist in the area.

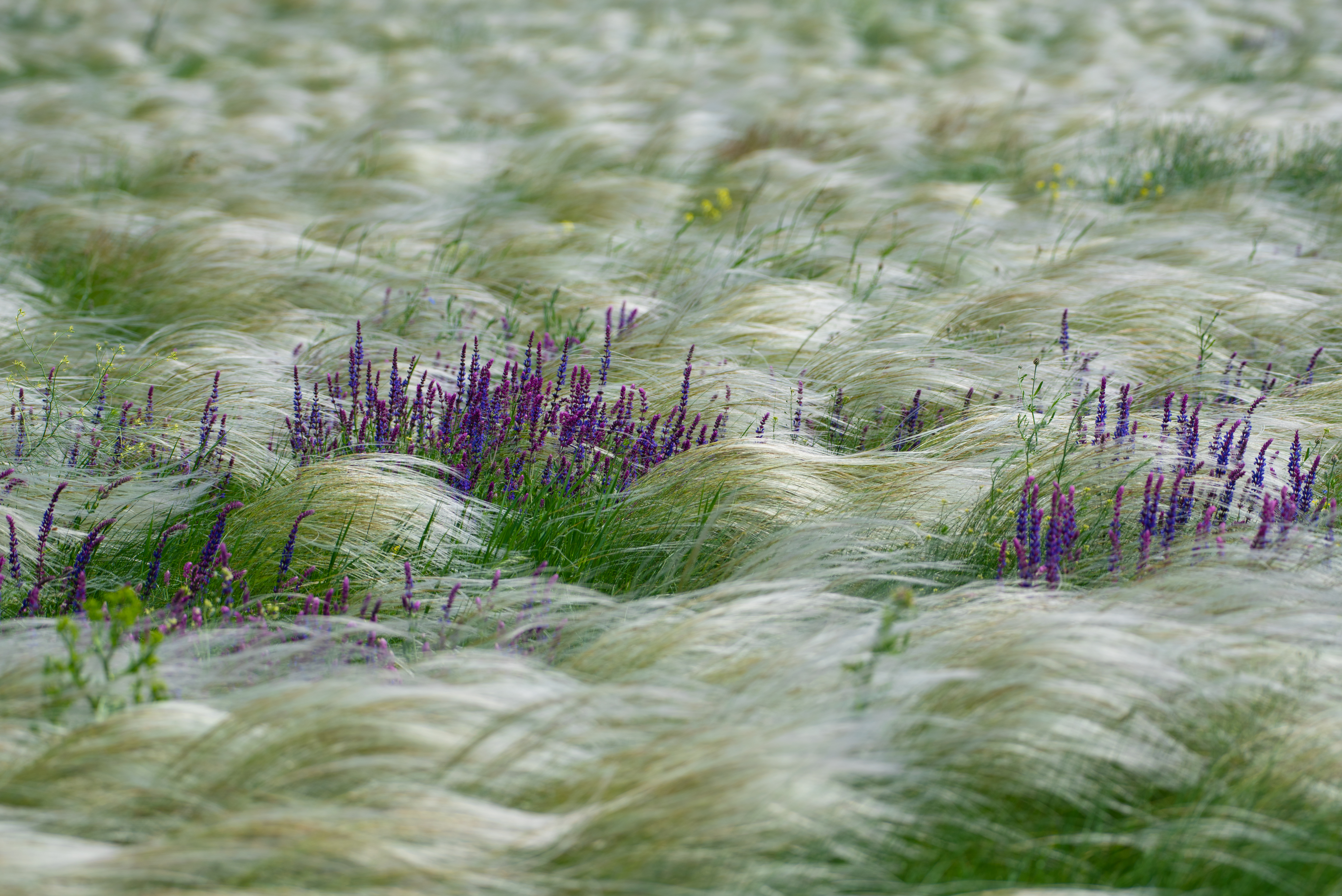
Salvia nemorosa

Plants

- Stipa capillata
- Stipa lessingiana
- Stipa pennata
- Pulsatilla pratensis
- Astragalus dasyanthus
- Ornithogalum oreoides
- Crocus reticulatus
- Bulbocodium versicolor

Animals

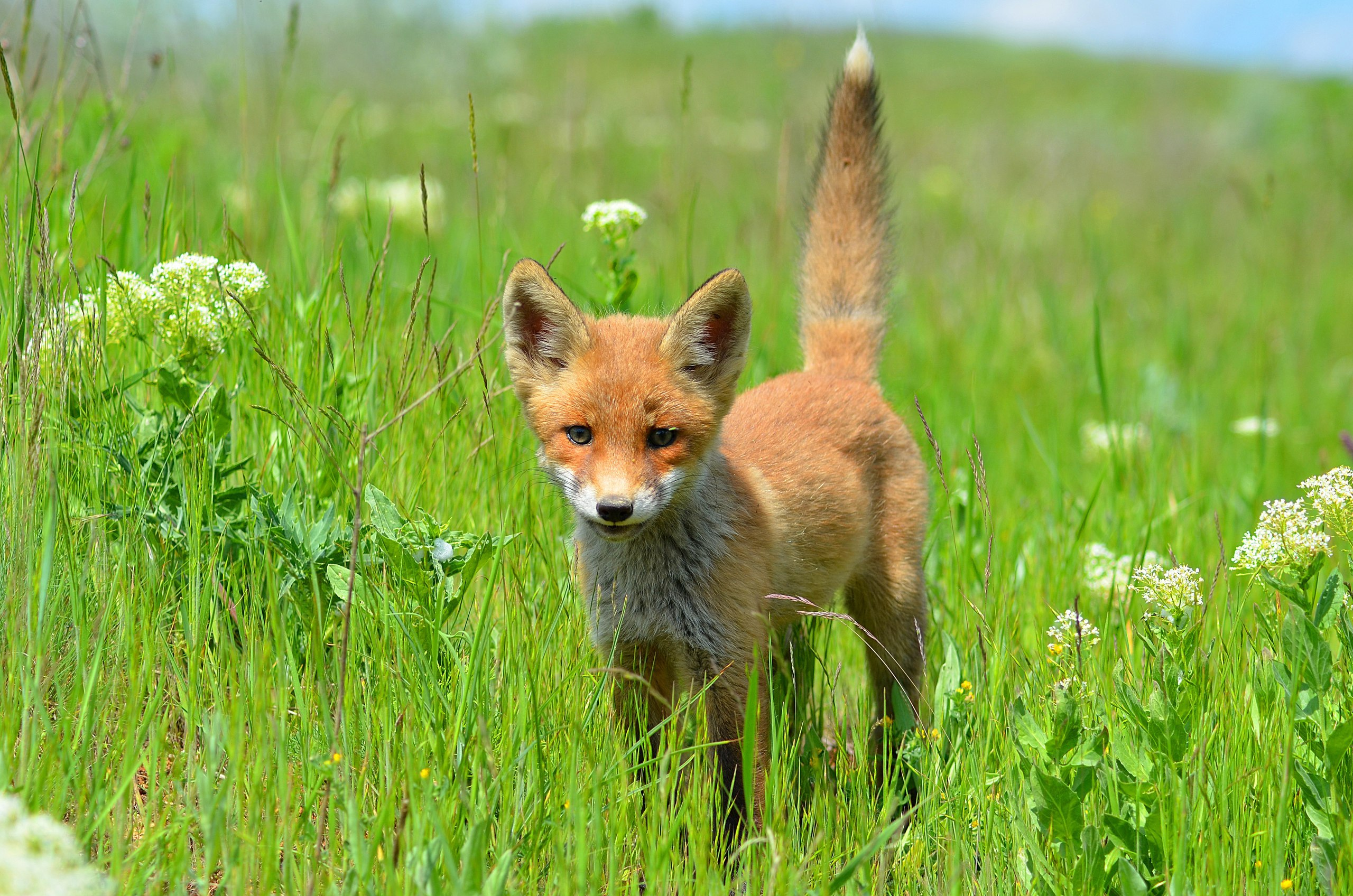
Vulpes vulpes

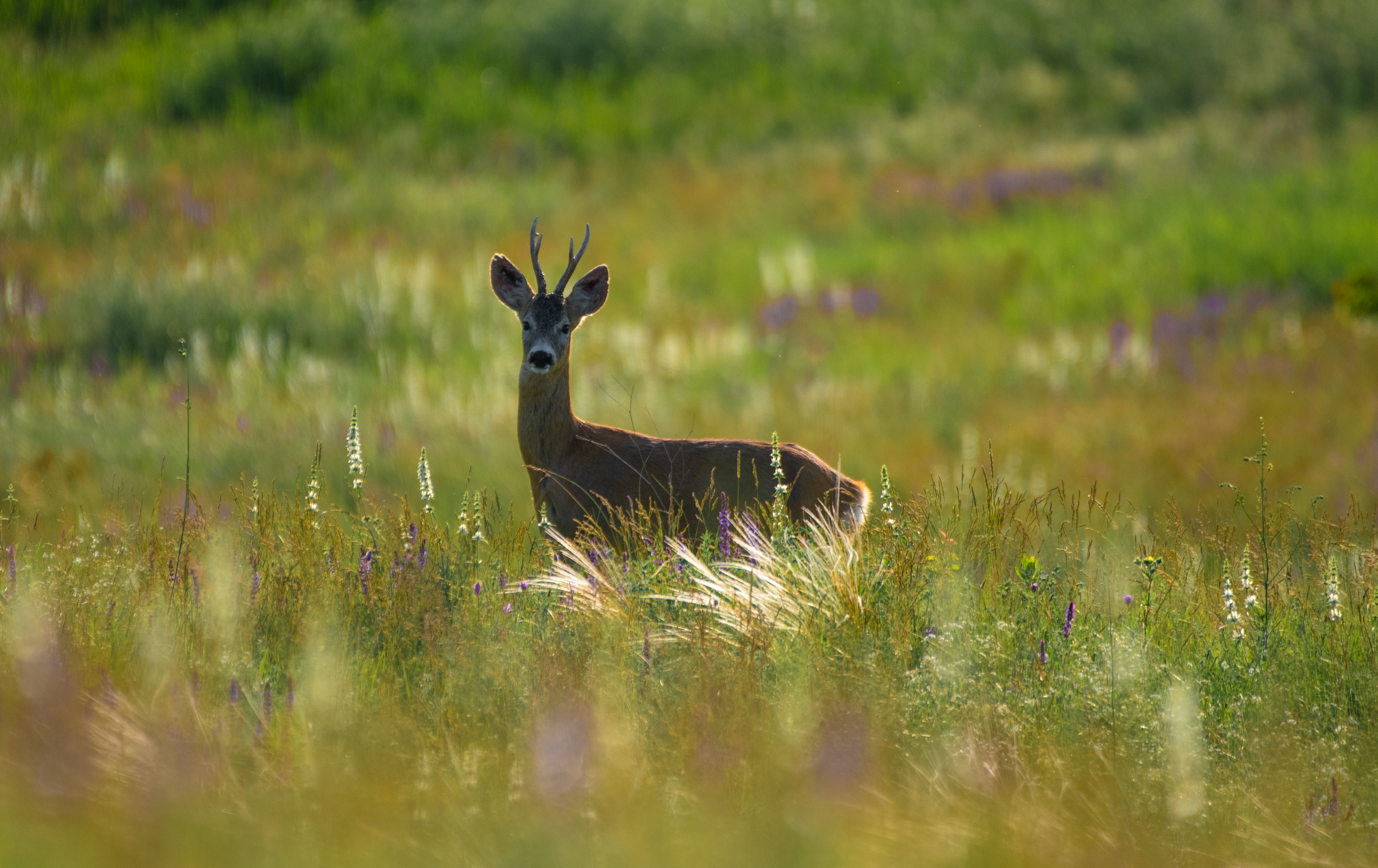
Capreolus capreolus

- Dolichophis caspius
- Elaphe quatuorlineata
- Sicista subtilis
- Mustela eversmanii
- Spalax arenarius
- Lanius excubitor (winter)
- Pastor roseus (migrates)
- Ciconia nigra (migrates)
- Circus cyaneus (winters)
- Buteo rufinus (nesting)
- Aquila chrysaetos (winters)
- Falco cherrug (nesting)
- Falco peregrinus (winters)
- Grus grus (migrates)
- Anthropoides virgo (migrates)
- Otis tarda (winters)
- Burhinus oedicnemus (nesting)

== Gallery ==
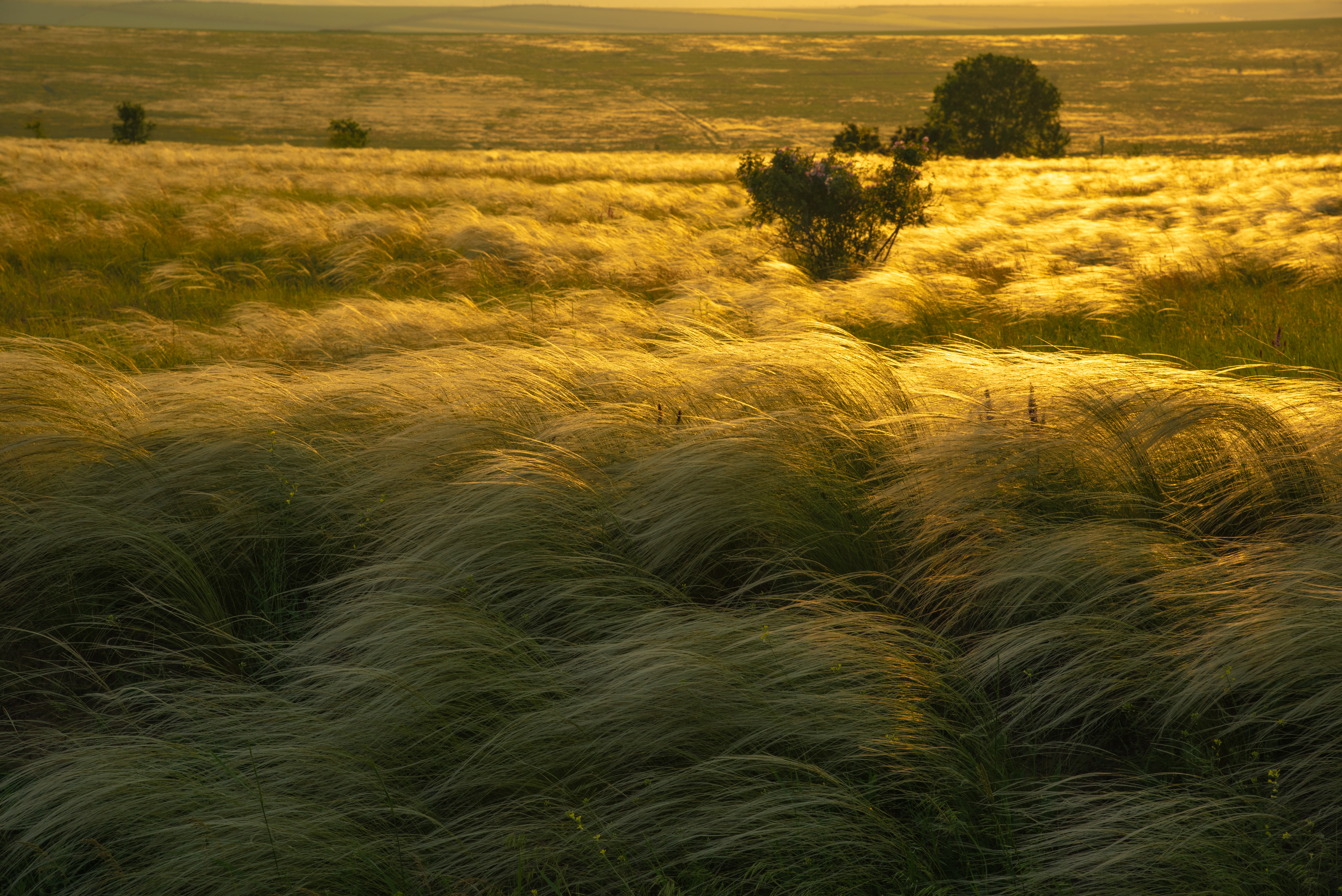

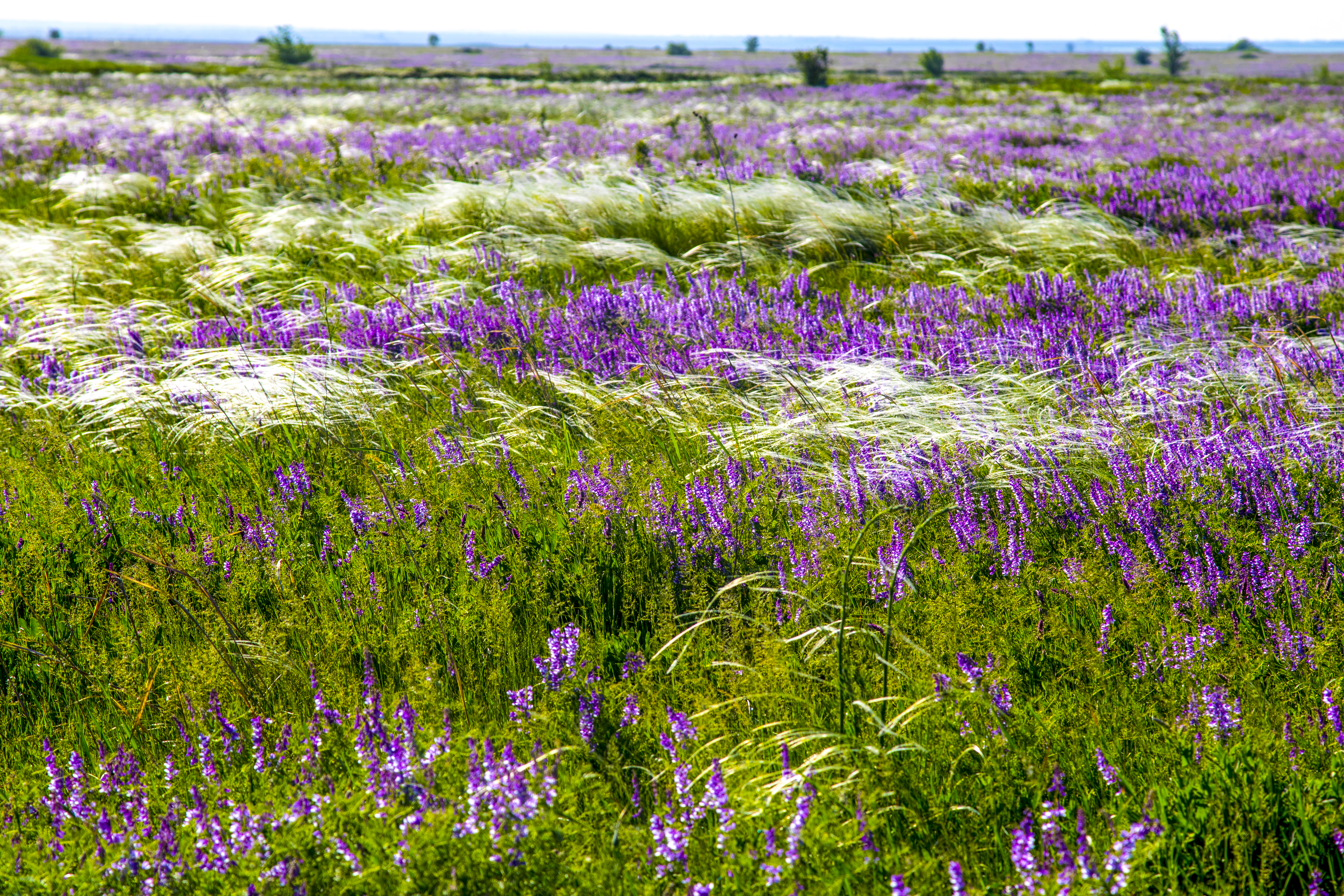
