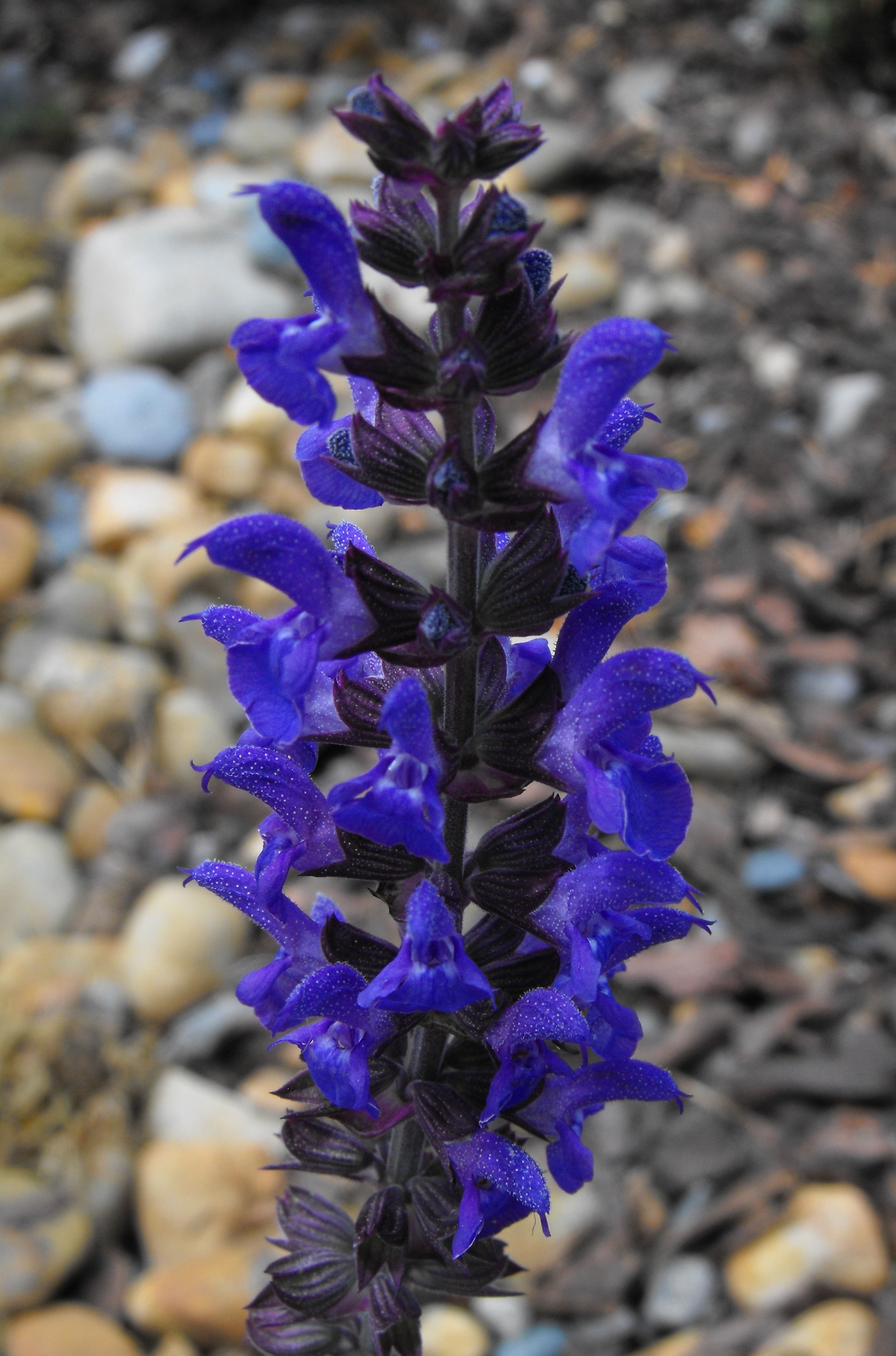

Scientific classification
- Kingdom: Plantae
- Clade: Tracheophytes
- Clade: Angiosperms
- Clade: Eudicots
- Clade: Asterids
- Order: Lamiales
- Family: Lamiaceae
- Genus: Salvia
- Species: S. × superba

Binomial name
- Salvia × superba (Silva Tar. & C.K.Schneid.) Stapf

= Salvia × superba =

Species of flowering plant

Salvia × superba is a widely grown Salvia hybrid. Its origins are unknown, though it first appeared in cultivation, and its parents are believed to include Salvia × sylvestris and Salvia amplexicaulis. Salvia nemorosa has also been suggested as a direct parent or close relative, but with so many similarities between these species and hybrids, there is no conclusive evidence. It is often mistakenly called Salvia superba.

Salvia × superba grows about 1 m (3.3 ft) tall, with flowers ranging from violet-blue to pale pink. The flowers grow in whorls that are a bit more separated than in their parents. Selected cultivars include the confusingly named 'Superba', and 'Rubin'. The cultivar 'Rubin' has gained the Royal Horticultural Society's Award of Garden Merit.
