= Shcholkine =

City in Crimea

Shcholkine Щолкіне (Ukrainian) Щёлкино (Russian) Şçolkino (Crimean Tatar)
- City
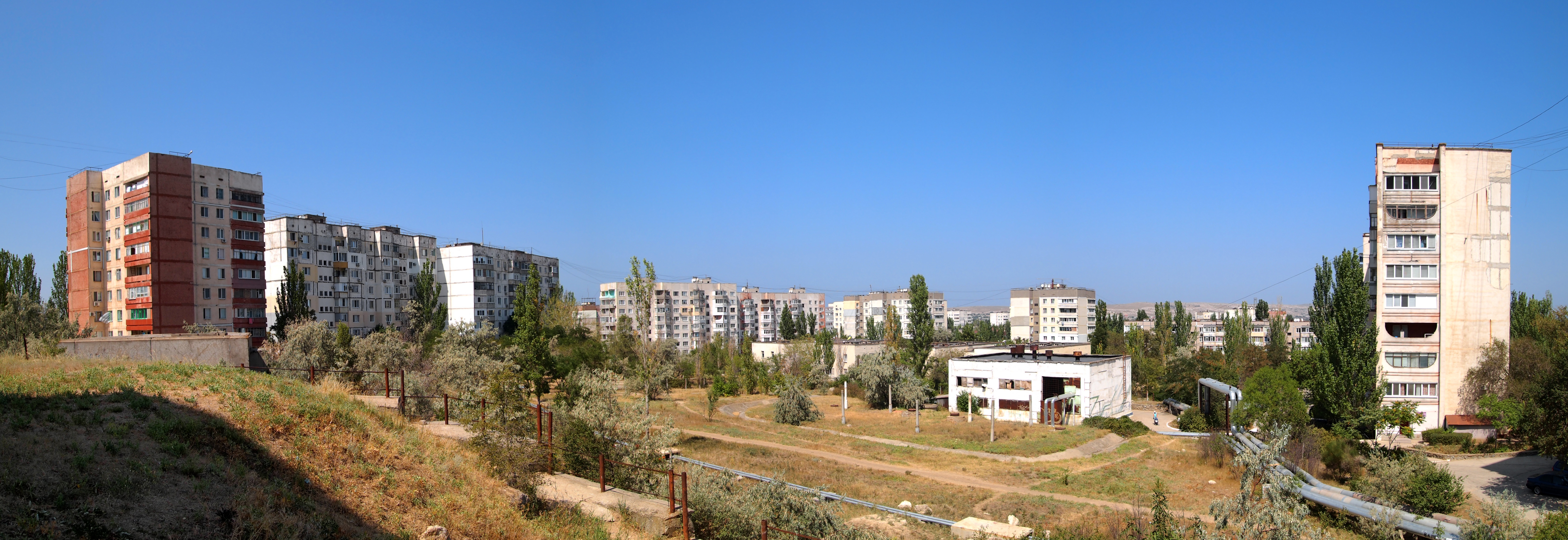

- Flag Coat of arms
- Interactive map of Shcholkine
- Location of Shcholkine within the Crimea Shcholkine (Ukraine) Shcholkine (European Russia) Shcholkine (Europe)
- Coordinates: 45°25′25″N 35°49′7″E
- Country: Ukraine (occupied by Russia)
- Autonomous republic: Crimea (de jure)
- Raion: Kerch Raion (de jure)
- Federal subject: Crimea (de facto)
- District: Lenine District (de facto)
- Established: 1978

Area
  - Total: 3.42 km^{2} (1.32 sq mi)
- Elevation: 20 m (66 ft)

Population (2014)
  - Total: 10,620
  - Density: 3,110/km^{2} (8,040/sq mi)
- Time zone: UTC+3 (MSK)
- Postal code: 98213
- Area code: +7-36557
- ^{1} Autonomous Republic of Crimea (de jure) or Republic of Crimea (de facto), depending on jurisdiction.

Shcholkine (Ukrainian: Щолкіне IPA: [ˈʃtʃɔlʲkine]; Crimean Tatar: Şçolkino), also commonly known as Shchelkino or Shchyolkino by its Russian name (Russian: Щёлкино), is a small city in Crimea. Geographically, Shcholkine is located near the headland of Kazantyp, on a peninsula jutting northward out into the Sea of Azov from the Crimean mainland. Population: 11,677 (2001); 10,620 (2014 Census).

== History ==
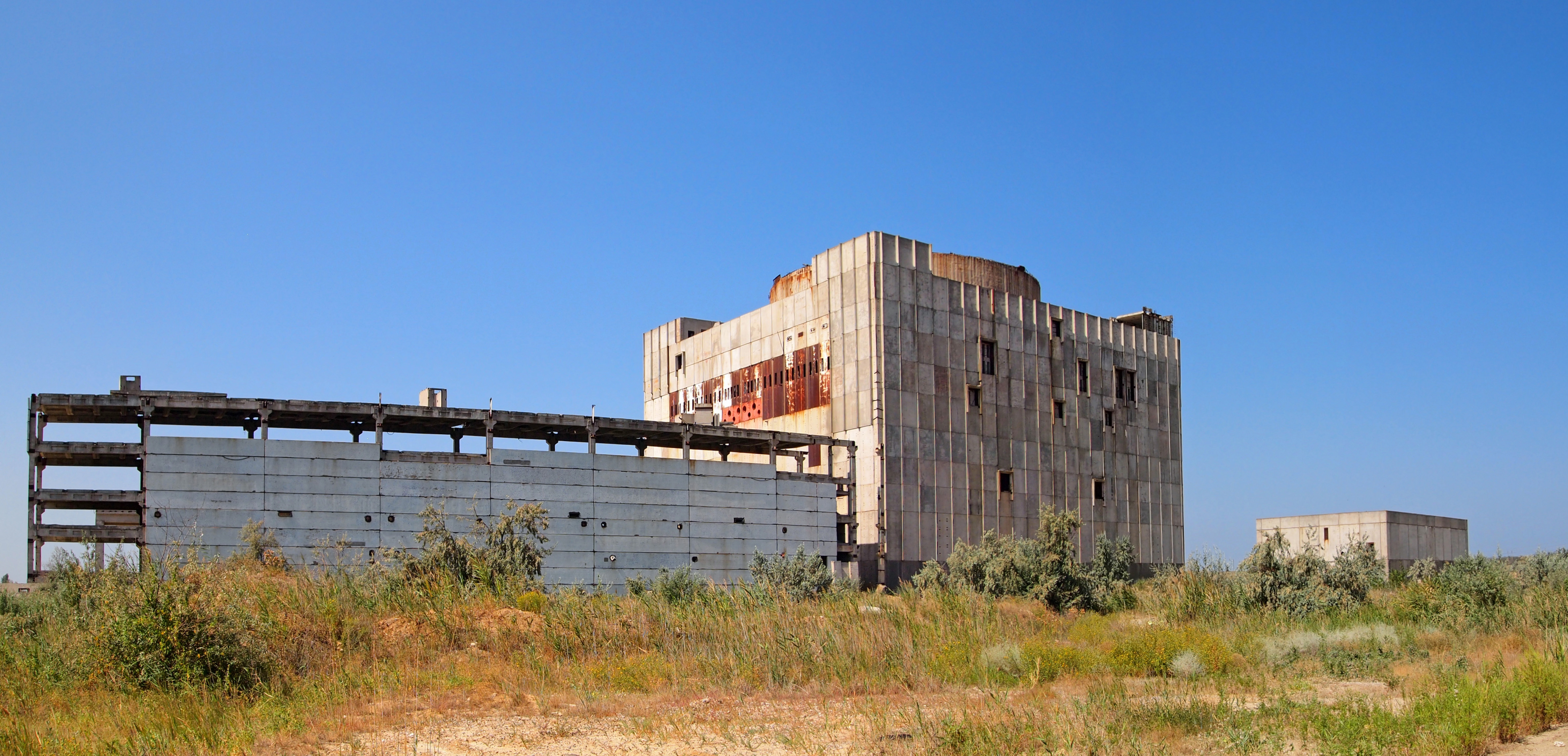
A view of the abandoned Crimean Atomic Energy Station

Shcholkine is named after Kirill Shchelkin, a Soviet physicist. Originally, the town was constructed in 1978 to house workers of the Crimean Atomic Energy Station (nuclear power plant). The station was inspected following the Chernobyl disaster of 1986, and was found to be located on a geologically volatile site. Construction of the facility was summarily abandoned.

Shcholkine is known for being an increasingly popular tourist destination and dacha site. Shcholkine's beach has boat and surfboard rental facilities. Nearby Kazantyp is home to several attractions, including a local fairground and paintball competitions. The town itself has a central market, many cafes and stores, and entertainment facilities including a movie theater and an internet cafe. The town's main attraction is considered to be its beach, a kilometer-long sandbar situated between cliffs that jut out over the Sea of Azov to the south and Kazantyp to the northwest. Between 1993 and 1999, Kazantyp was the site of the KaZantip music festival, which later (2001-2013) moved to the little village of Popivka near Yevpatoria.

== Demographics ==
The 2001 Ukrainian Census recorded the population of Shcholkine as 11,677 persons. Ethnically the population is predominantly Russian, Ukrainian, and Crimean Tatar. Major religions can be assumed to include atheism or agnosticism, Eastern Orthodox Christianity, and Islam, although there is only one church in Shcholkine's immediate vicinity. The lingua franca in the town is Russian. In contrast, the Ukrainian language is natively spoken by a significant minority and in educational institutions, as well as by tourists from mainland Ukraine. The Crimean Tatar language is rarely used in the city.

Ethnic groups in Shcholkine
	percent
Russians	56.90%
Ukrainians	26.56%
Belarusians	0.81%
Crimean Tatars	0.75%
Moldovans	0.26%
Armenians	0.19%
Poles	0.14%
Azerbaijanis	0.12%
Tatars	0.11%

The 2014 Crimean census recorded a population of 15,450 persons, with around 5,000 being refugees. The Crimean Tatar population, which had mostly fled to mainland Ukraine, comprised a significant portion of these refugees.
