= Ukrainian Steppe Nature Reserve =

Nature Reserve in Ukraine

- Ukrainian: Український степовий природний заповідник
- IUCN category Ia (strict nature reserve)
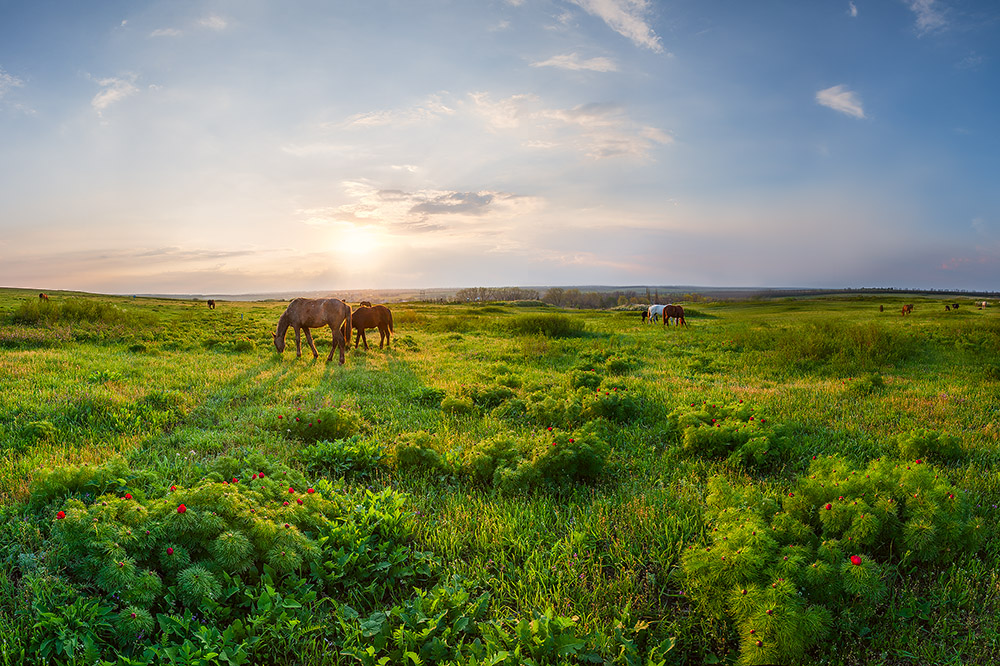
- Ukrainian Steppe Nature Reserve

- Location within Ukraine
- Location: Donetsk Oblast
- Coordinates: 47°06′N 38°00′E
- Area: 2,768 hectares (6,840 acres; 28 km^{2}; 11 sq mi)
- Established: 1961
- Governing body: National Academy of Sciences of Ukraine
- Website: http://ukrainaincognita.com/donetska-oblast/volodarskyi-raion/ukrainskyi-stepovyi-pryrodnyi-zapovidnyk

Ukrainian Steppe Nature Reserve (Ukrainian: Український степовий природний заповідник) is a protected nature reserve of Ukraine that protects a collection of primitive steppe tracts in Donetsk Oblast of the Ukrainian southeast. Each tract is a different sub-type of Ukrainian steppe.

== Topography ==
Originally the reserve stood in a vast dryland steppe that stretched from the Azov Sea and Black Sea north for 500-700 km. Over times most of this area was converted to agriculture and only a few small sectors left in an uncultivated state. There are four main branches of the reserve, each protecting a different representative type of steppe for the region.

- Khomutov Steppe. Located in Kalmiuske Raion, near border with Russia. Established in 1921. Reportedly occupied by separatists in 2014. (1,030 hectares)
- Stone Tombs
- Chalk Flora. Limestone cliffs along the right bank of the Donets River, supporting pine and oak forests. (1,134 hectares)
- Kalmius Reserve. Rocky steppe (560 million year old granite) on floodplain of the Kalmius River. (580 hectares)

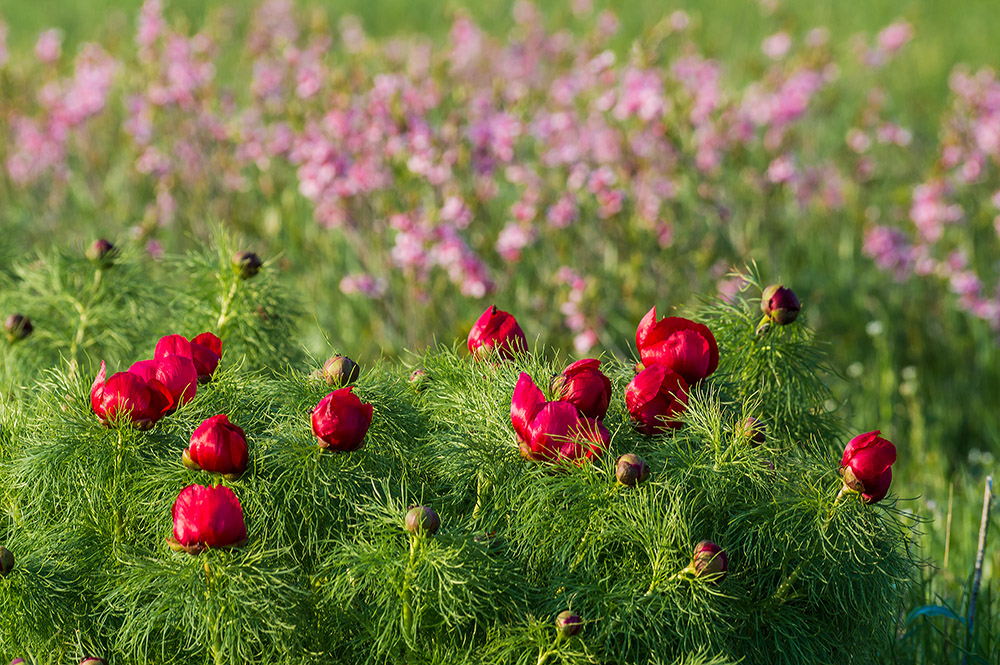
Fine-leaved peonies (Paeonia tenuifolia in the reserve

== Climate and ecoregion ==
The official climate designation for the Ukrainian Steppe area is ""Humid continental climate - warm summer sub-type"" (Köppen climate classification Dfb), with large seasonal temperature differentials and a warm summer (at least four months averaging over 10 °C (50 °F), but no month averaging over 22 °C (72 °F).

== Flora and fauna ==
Common grasses in the reserve tracts are feather grass (Stipa), bunchgrass (Stipa capillata), and fescue (Festuca). Scientists in the reserve report 926 species of higher plants, 26 species of mammals, 115 species of birds and 10 species of fish.

== Public use ==
As a strict nature reserve, Ukrainian Steppe's primary purpose is protection of nature and scientific study. Public access is limited: mass recreation and construction of facilities is prohibited as are hunting and fishing. There is public access to the "Stone Tomb" historical site, which features a museum. Located in southeast Ukraine in disputed territory, some tracts of the reserve may have been occupied by separatists in 2014.

== See also ==
- Lists of Nature Preserves of Ukraine (class Ia protected areas)
- National Parks of Ukraine (class II protected areas)
