= Crimean Atomic Energy Station =

Unfinished, abandoned nuclear power plant in Crimea

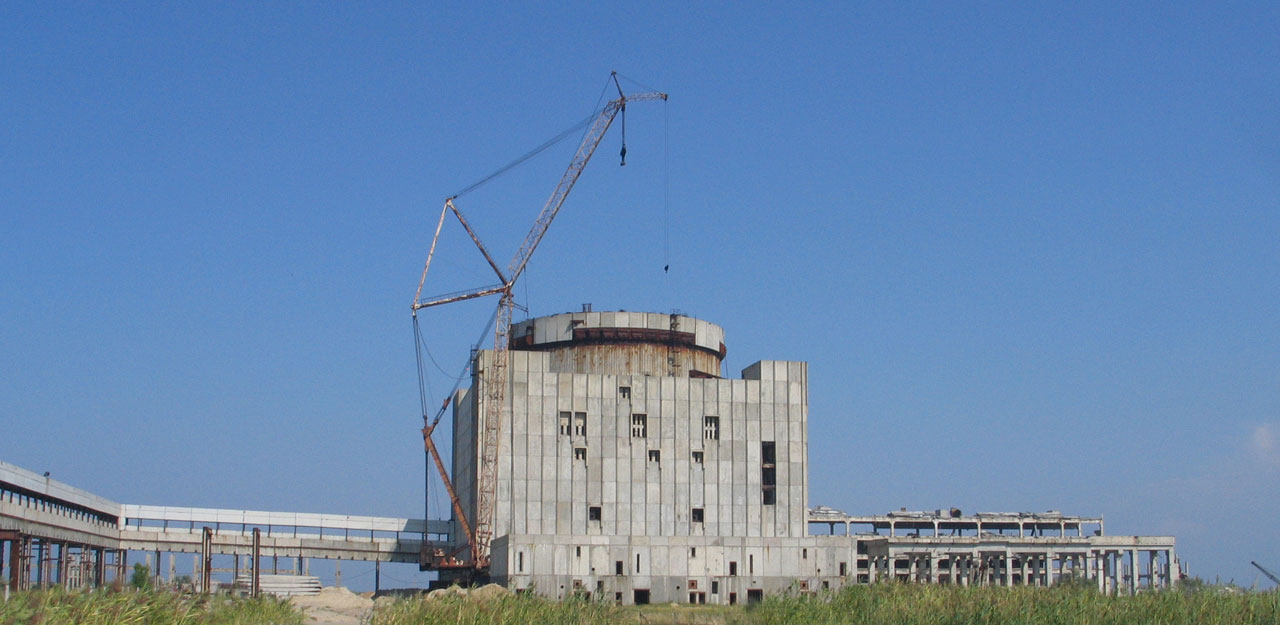
- The unfinished unit 1 of the Crimean Atomic Energy Station
- Official name: Кримська АЕС
- Country: Russia; Soviet Union; Ukraine
- Coordinates: 45°23′29″N 35°48′06″E
- Status: Cancelled
- Operator: Rosatom

External links
- Commons: Related media on Commons

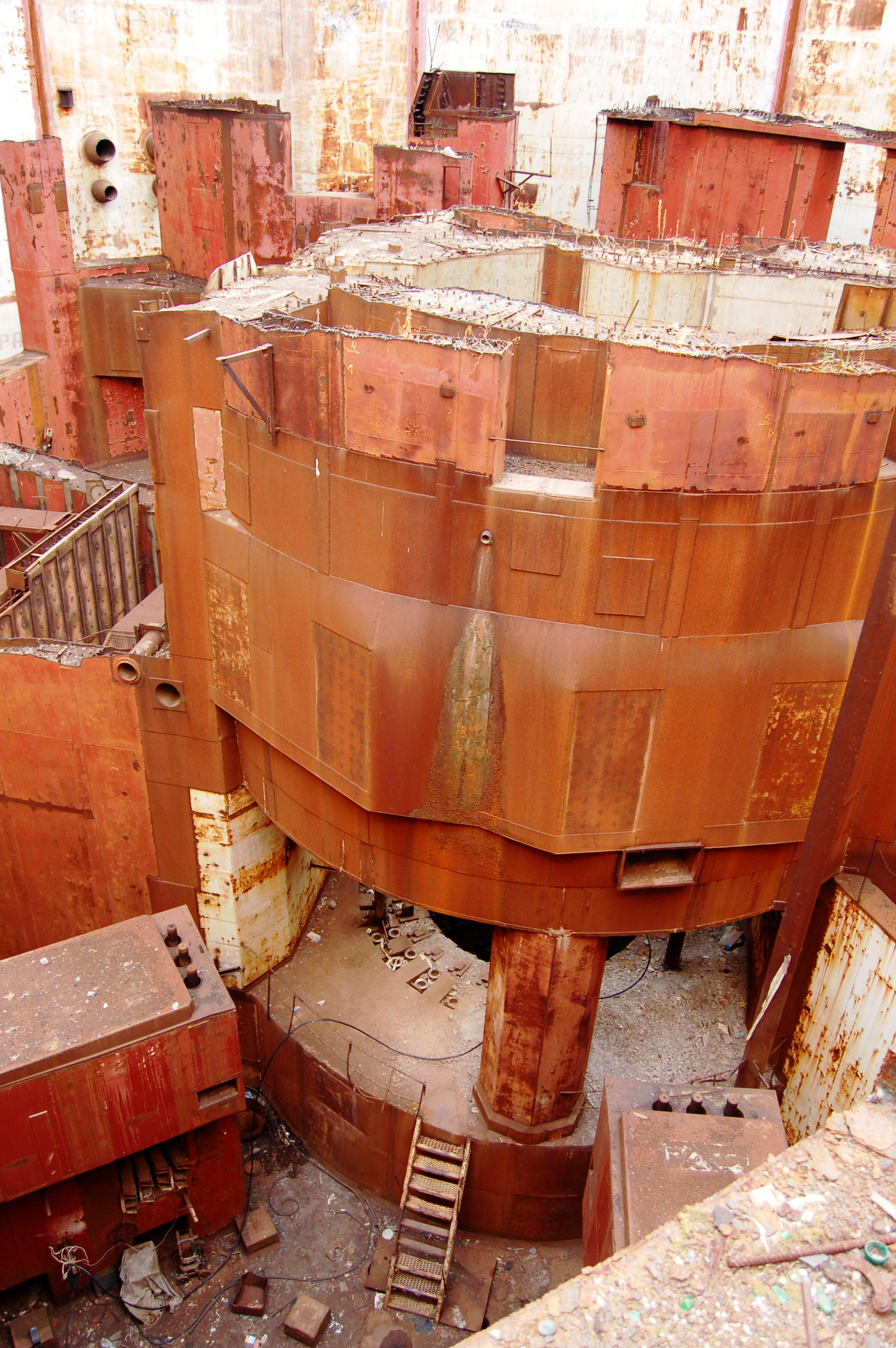
Abandoned Crimean Atomic Energy Station

The Crimean Nuclear Power Station (Ukrainian: Кримська АЕС; Russian: Крымская АЭС) is an abandoned and unfinished nuclear power plant near the cape of Kazantyp on banks of Aqtas Lake in Crimea.

== History ==
Construction work on the plant started in 1976, and the nearby town of Shcholkine was constructed in 1978 to house workers working on the project. The station was inspected following the Chernobyl disaster of 1986, and was found to be located on a geologically volatile site. Construction of the facility was summarily abandoned in 1989.

Between 1993 and 1999 the plant was home to the electronic music festival KaZantip. The festival was referred to as the "Reaktor" for this reason.

From 1998 to 2004 the station was under jurisdiction of the Ministry of Fuel (Ukraine). In 2004 it was passed to the government of Crimea. In 2005 the Crimean representation of the State Property Fund sold the station to an undisclosed firm.

== See also ==
- Nuclear power in Ukraine
