= KaZantip =

Music festival in Crimea

Coordinates: 45°17′31″N 33°02′18″E

Republic of KaZantip Республика КаZантип
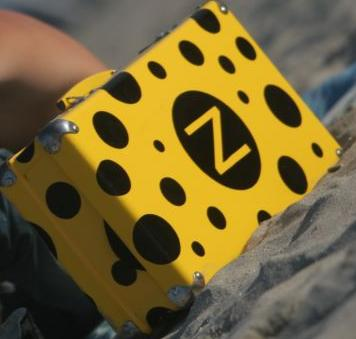
- Genre: Electronic dance music
- Dates: 2–3 weeks in August
- Locations: Popivka, Crimea (2014)
- Years active: 1992-2014
- Attendance: 100,000+
- Website: kazantipa.net

KaZantip, also known simply as "Z", was an electronic dance music festival that took place every year from 1992 to 2013 on the Crimean Peninsula; from 2002 to 2013, it was held in the village of Popivka, near Yevpatoria. The entrance ticket is called a "viZa". It takes place for 2–3 weeks in August, and about 100,000 "paradiZers" visit each year. There is a cult of orange-coloured fashion and yellow suitcases associated with the festival.

After the annexation of Crimea by the Russian Federation in 2014, the festival took place outside of Crimea for the first time ever, in Anaklia, Georgia. In 2015, it was to be held 18–28 February on the Koh Puos Island in Sihanoukville, Cambodia, but was cancelled at the last minute by the local authorities.

== History ==
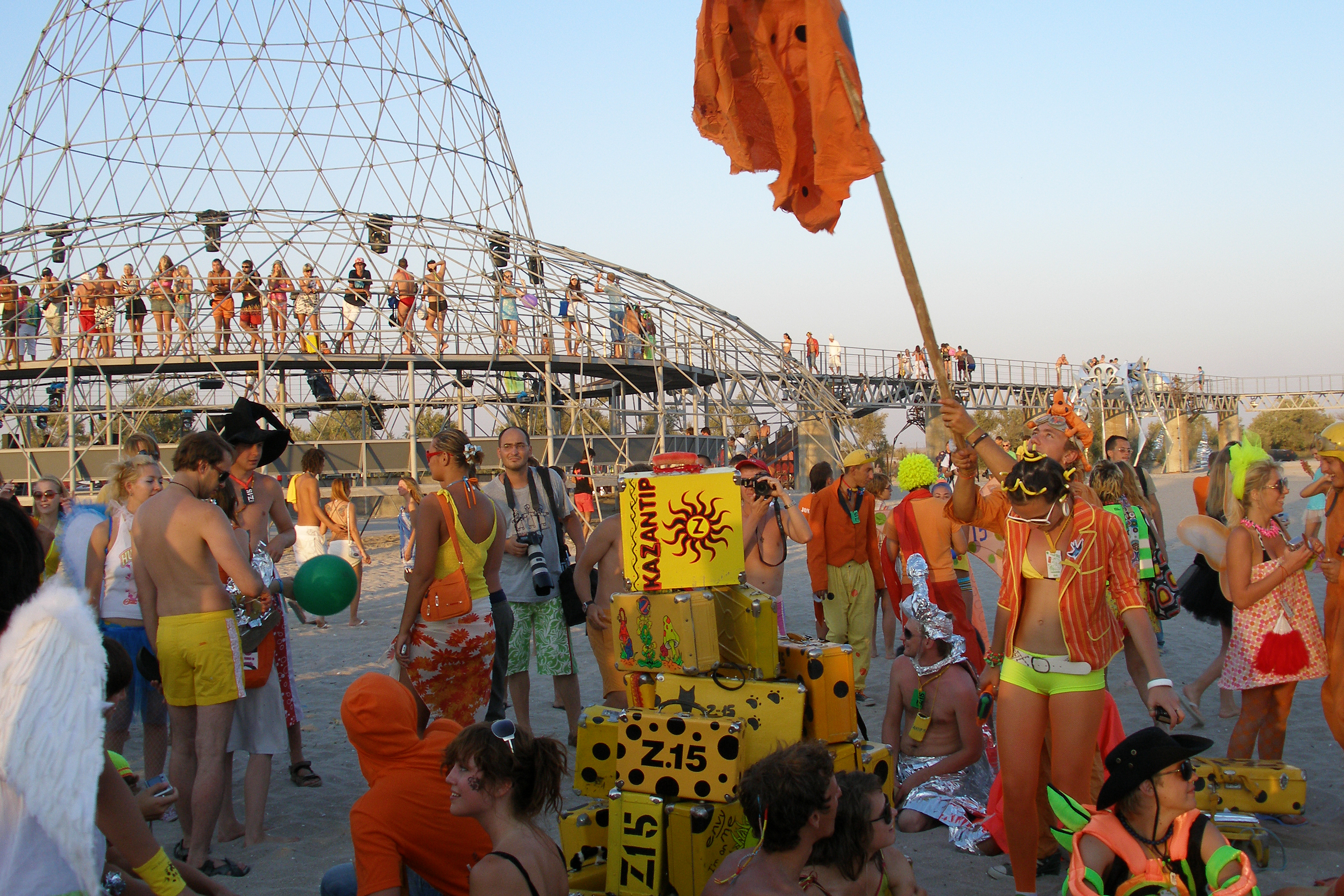
Orange is the main color of KaZantip.

The festival is named for the Kazantyp headland, near which it was held from 1995 to 1999. During that time, the festival took place inside the turbine hall of the unfinished Crimean Atomic Energy Station, near Shchelkino. The festival was moved to the Vesele (also referred to as Veseloye) settlement in 2000. Since 2001, the festival has been held in the Crimean town of Popivka (also referred to as Popovka). The president, creator, and initiator of Kazantip (Republic Z) is Nikita I (actual name, Nikita Marshunok). In the beginning, the festival was very low-key and was nothing more than a bunch of windsurfers partying after a hard day's wave riding. But later, Nikita decided to include a techno and trance music party to celebrate the end of the season. This gave birth to the festival in the form which made it popular internationally.

The 2014 edition, called "Z22", took place in Anaklia, Georgia, due to the annexation of Crimea by the Russian Federation. The Anaklia festival proved controversial from the start, as members of the Georgian Orthodox Church protested the event due to fears of drugs and nudity at the festival. The head of Georgia's National Tourism Administration also publicly claimed that he was fired over a dispute with the church about the 2014 festival's taking place in Anaklia.

== Traditions ==
There is a special celebration called "Mayovka", or "Happiness Parade", which, as a rule, is held from the end of April to the beginning of May. This is the Z-national holiday, dedicated to spring, friendship, and happiness. During these days, Z-people dance, take part in a Happiness Parade, show their happiness to each other, and prepare for the big summer events.

== Territory ==
KaZantip presents itself as a "virtual republic", with over 300 DJs on more than 14 dance floors, playing 24 hours per day. The republic is held on a piece of land covering 60,000 square metres (15 acres).

== Performances ==
DJs performing during KaZantip 2010 were (among others) Carl Cox, Hybrid, Marco Carola, Oliver Huntemann, DJ URI (Boston, USA), Armin Van Buuren, Guy Gerber, Josh Wink, and Seba. Season 2011 (also called "Z19") brought Pendulum as an opening headliner, Leeroy Thornhill (ex-keyboardist from The Prodigy) as one of the guest DJs, as well as John B, Marc Romboy, Richie Hawtin, Ricardo Villalobos, Guy Gerber, Maayan Nidam, Jonny White (Art Department) and many more. The 2012 lineup included Armin Van Buuren (Leiden, Netherlands), DJ URI (Boston, USA), Tiësto (Breda, Netherlands), Carl Cox (Oldham, England), Josh Wink (Philadelphia, USA), Skrillex (Los Angeles, USA), Rusko (Wheldrake, England), Benny Benassi (Reggio Emilia, Italy), Vika Jigulina (Timișoara, Romania), David Guetta (Paris, France), and quite a few more. In 2013, there were performances by Bobina, Ferry Corsten, Markus Schulz, Gabriel & Dresden, Maceo Plex, Adam Freeland, and many more.

== Gallery ==
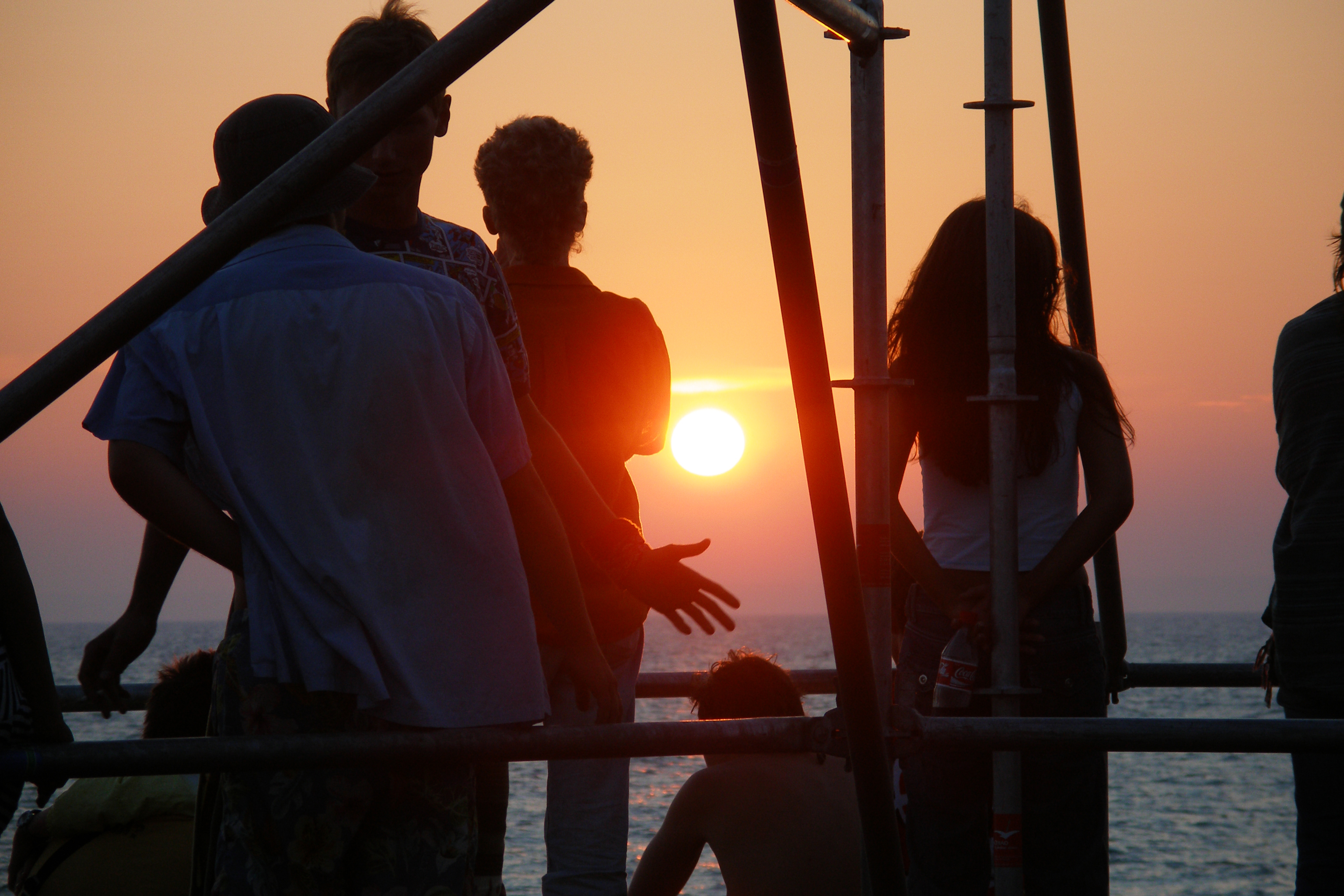

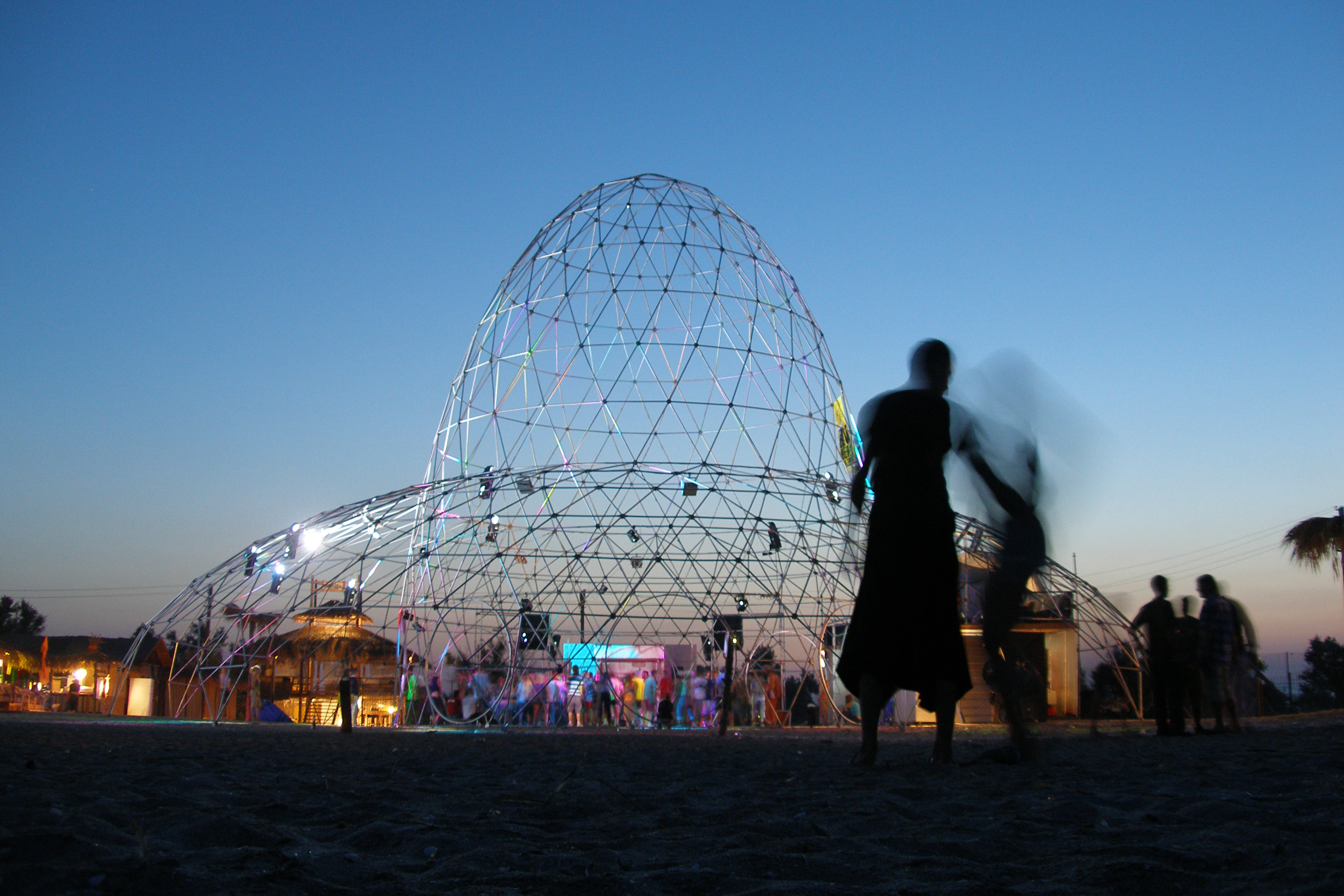

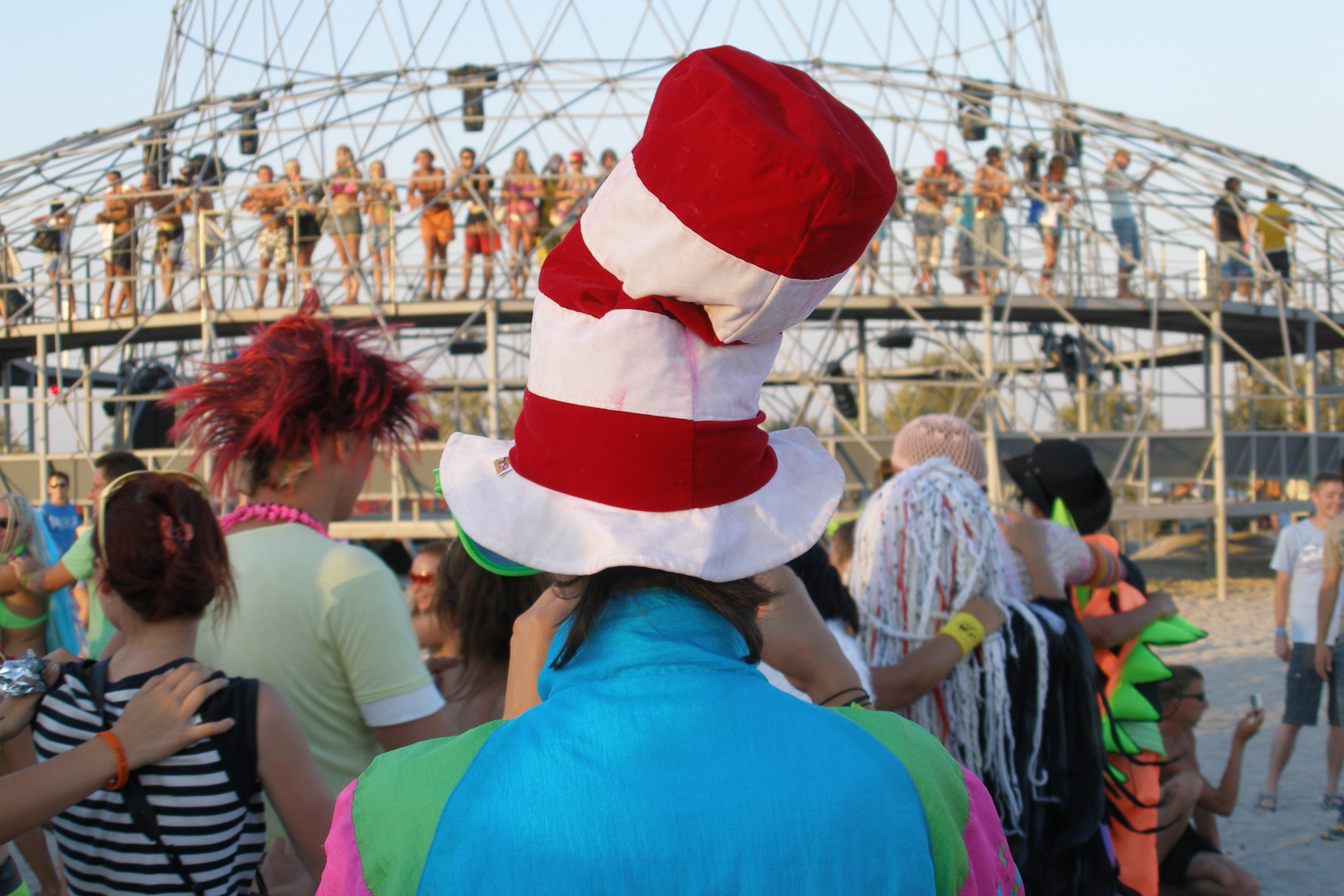

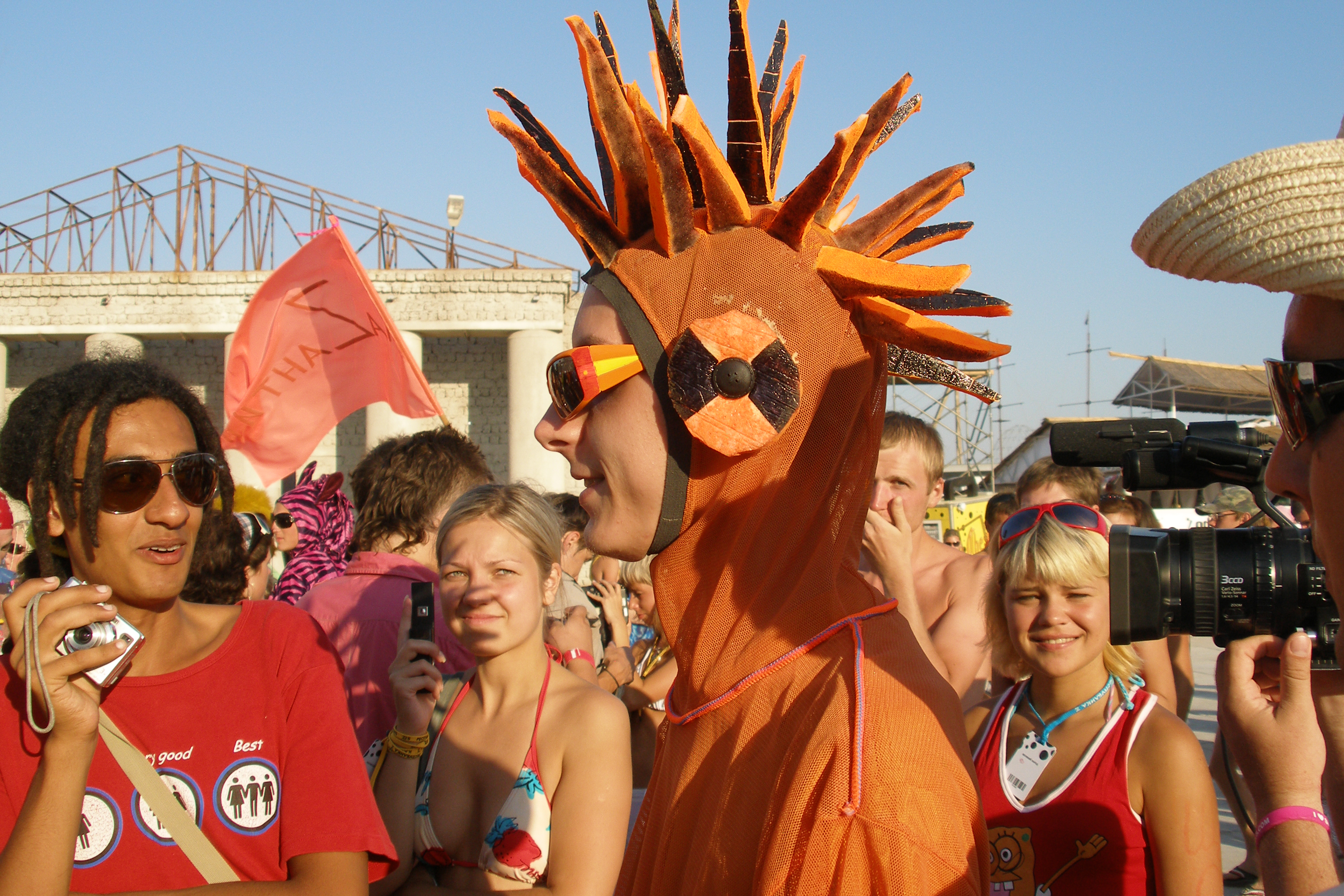

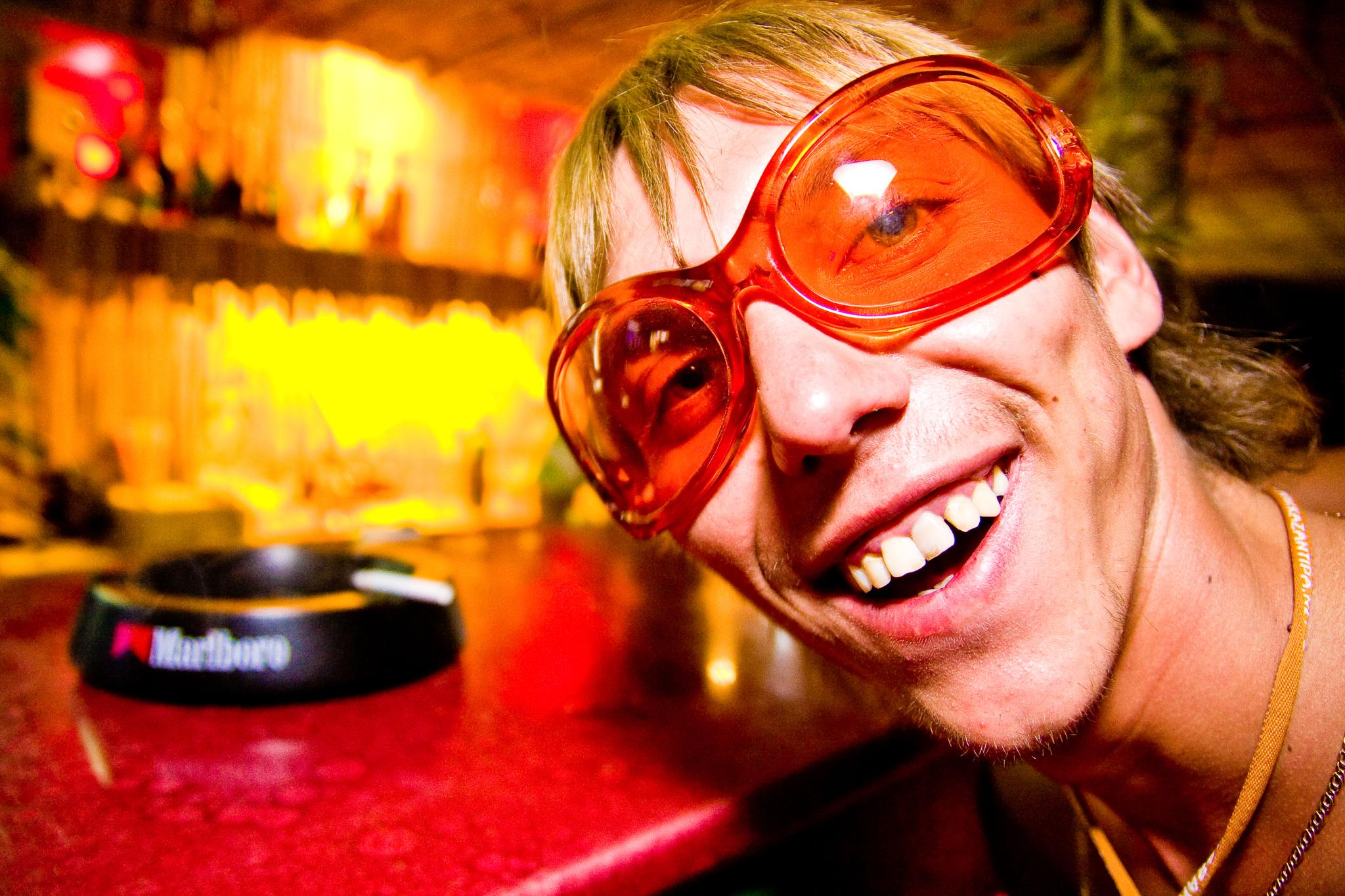

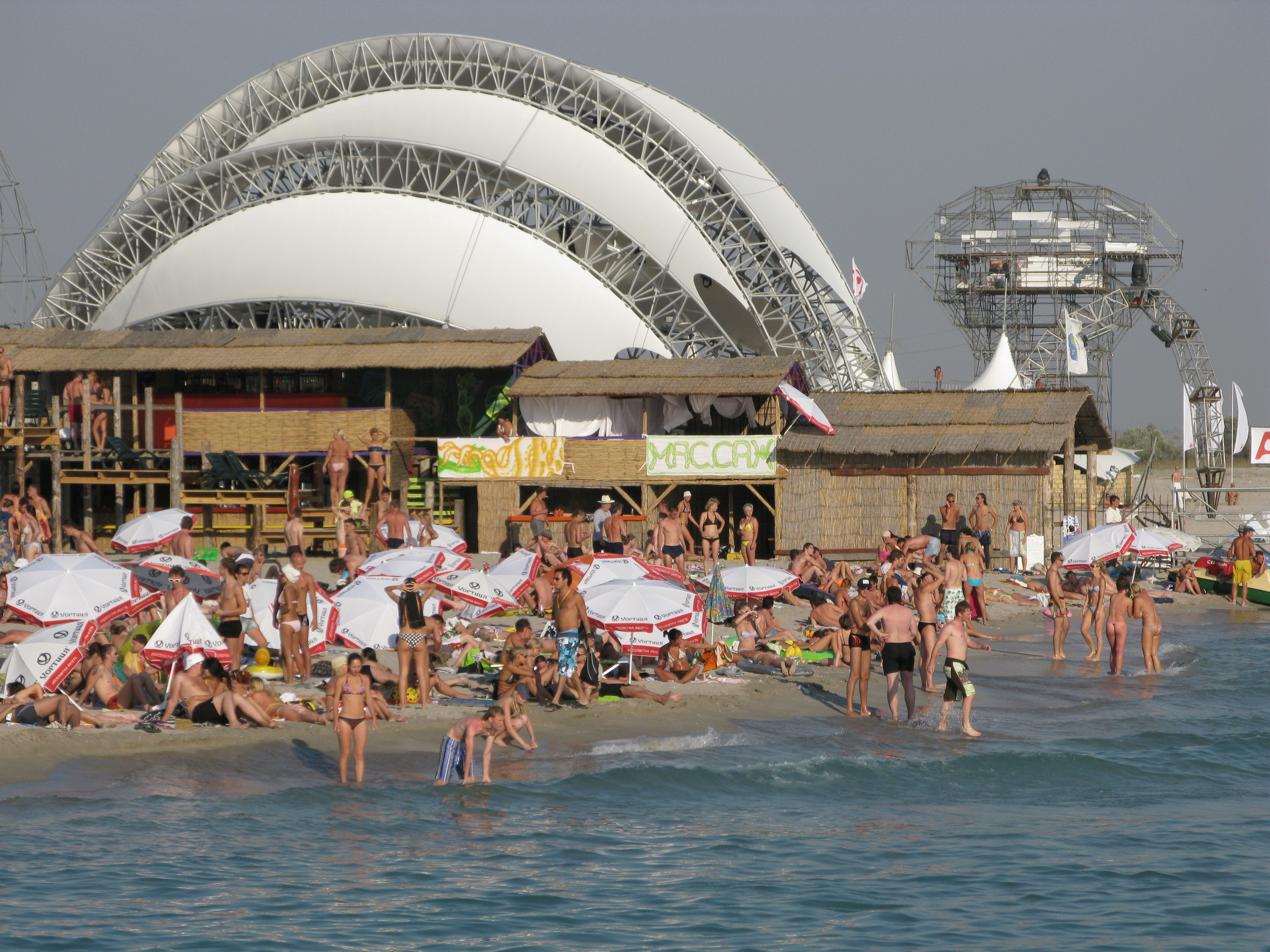

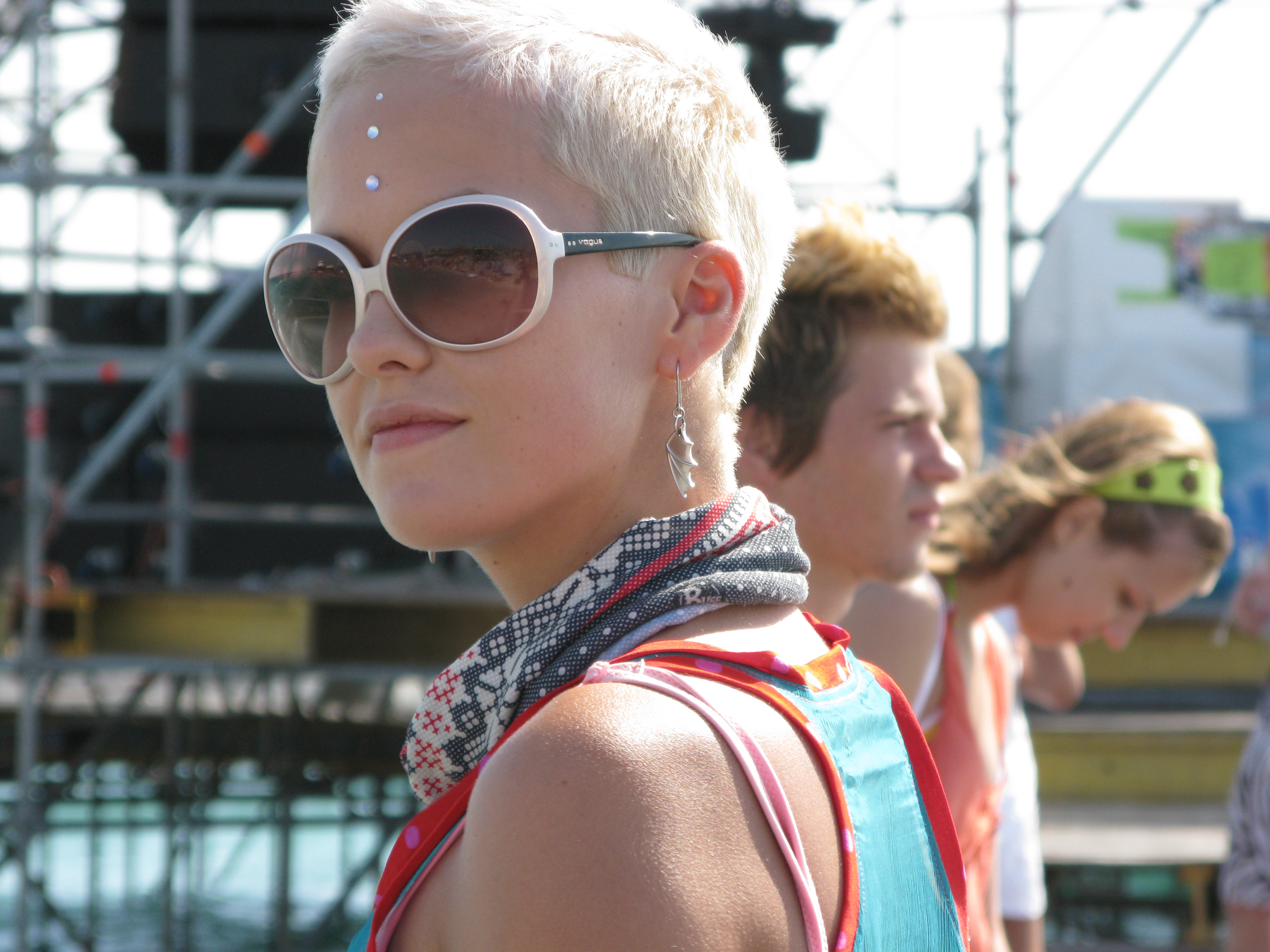

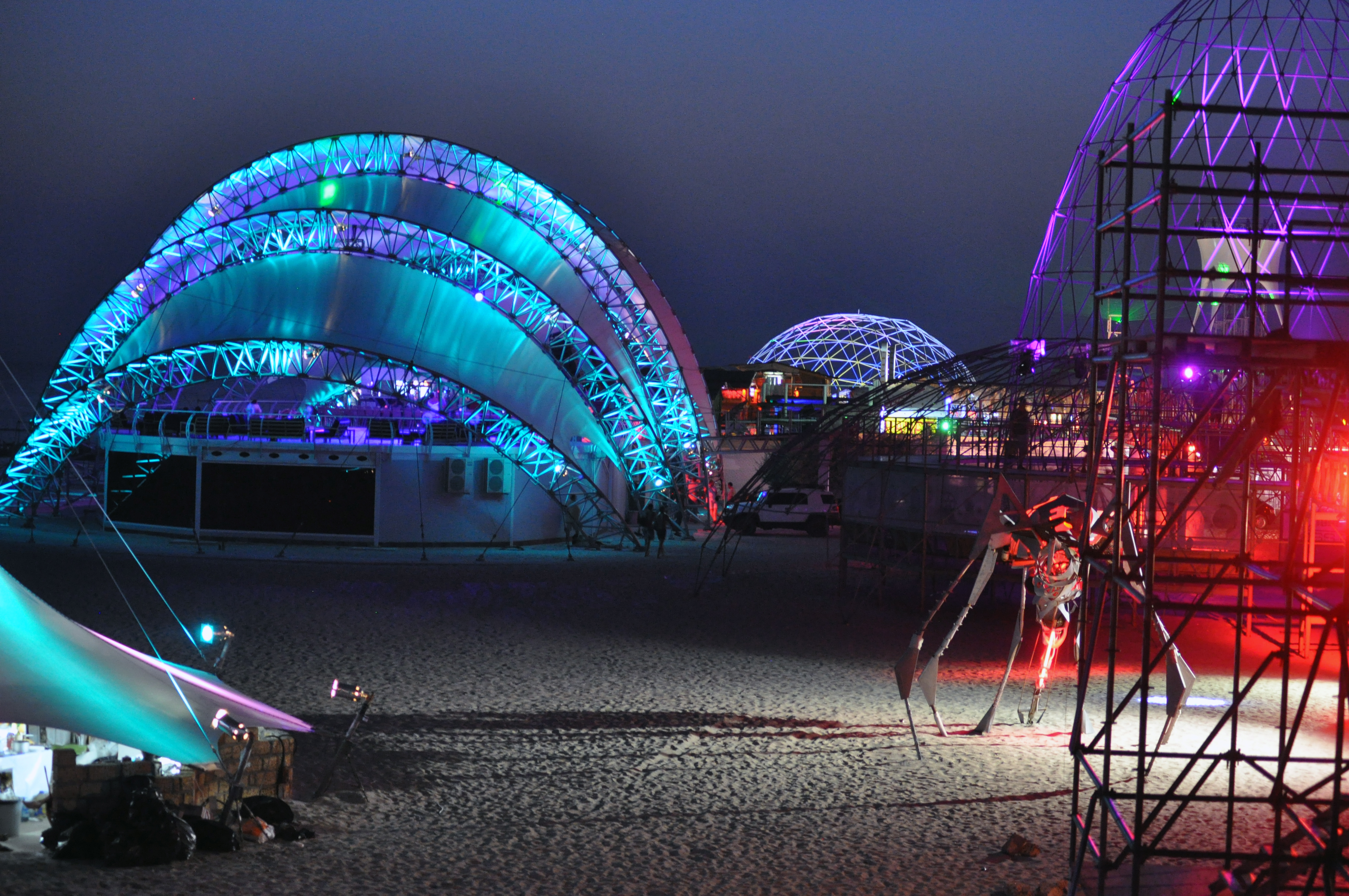

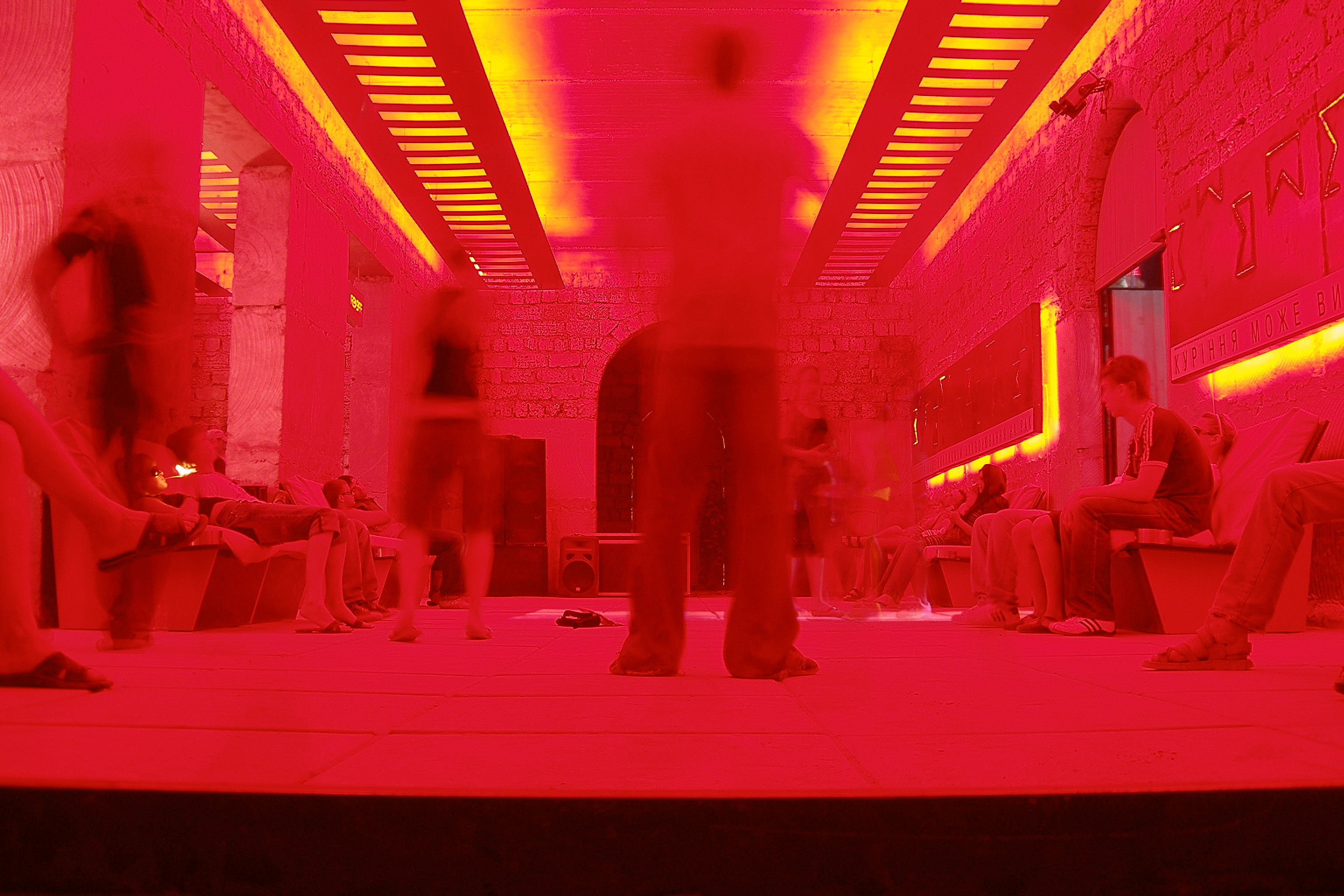

== See also ==
- List of electronic music festivals

== Literature ==
- Johnstone, Sarah; Bloom, Greg (2008). Ukraine. Country Guide Series. Lonely Planet. pp. 19, 191. ISBN 978-1-74104-481-2.
