= Aqtas Lake =

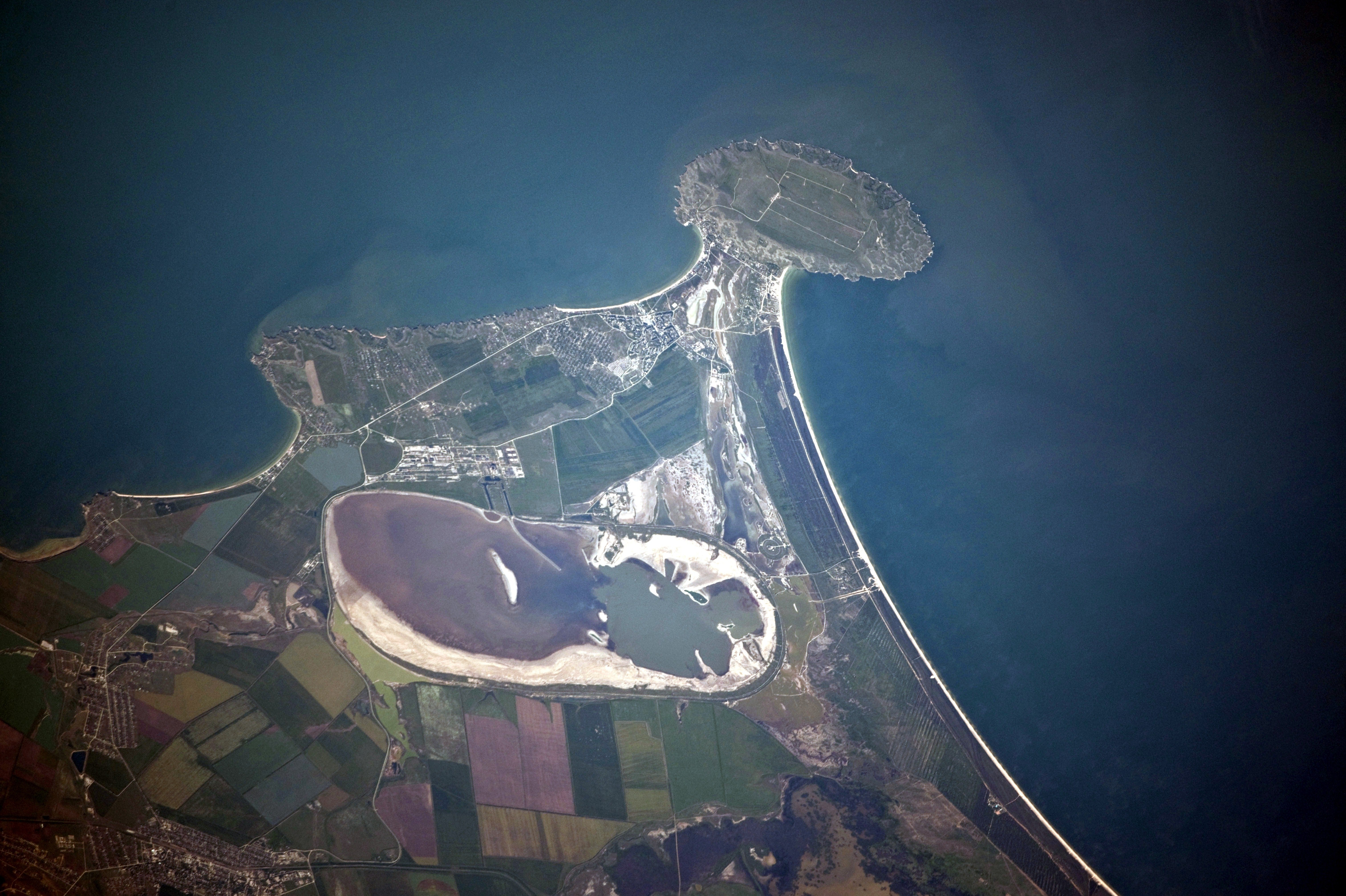
- View to Aktashskoye Lake from Space

- Location within Crimea
- Location: Crimea
- Coordinates: 45.373°N 35.827°E
- Type: salt lake

Aqtas Lake or Aktashskoye (Crimean Tatar: Aqtaş gölü; Russian: Акташское озеро; Ukrainian: Актаське озеро) is a drying salt lake at the Kerch Peninsula in the Lenine Raion, Crimea. The lake belongs to the Kerch group of lakes.

Its name means White Mount. Its water supplies it receives from the Black Sea Littoral Artesian Aquifer.

Lake is connected with the North Crimean Canal and through another canal with the Sea of Azov. Around 1980, the lake was intended to serve as a cooling pond for industrial water supply of the Crimean Nuclear Power Station. In the middle of the lake there is an island of Latau. There are also solonchaks. In the vicinity of Aqtas Lake there are the Astani Floodplains and the East Crimean Wind Power Station.
