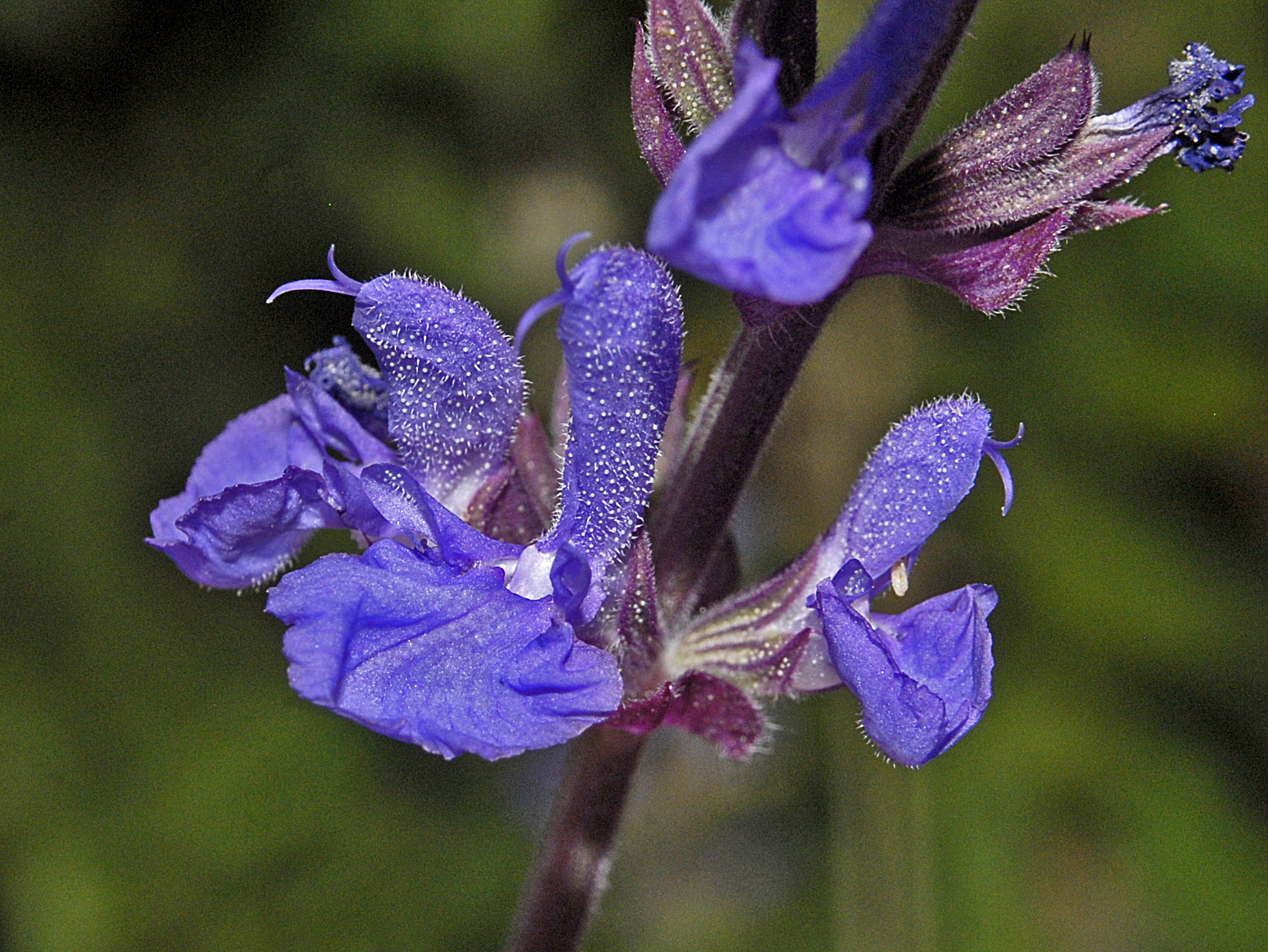
- Flowers of Salvia amplexicaulis at the Orto Botanico di Brera

Scientific classification
- Kingdom: Plantae
- Clade: Tracheophytes
- Clade: Angiosperms
- Clade: Eudicots
- Clade: Asterids
- Order: Lamiales
- Family: Lamiaceae
- Genus: Salvia
- Species: S. amplexicaulis

Binomial name
- Salvia amplexicaulis Lam.

Synonyms
- S. villicaulis

= Salvia amplexicaulis =

Species of flowering plant

Salvia amplexicaulis (Macedonian clary) is a herbaceous perennial that is native to southeastern Europe. It is a close relative of Salvia nemorosa. Its specific epithet, amplexicaulis, refers to the "stem-clasping" stem leaves which have no stalks. Violet-blue flowers grow closely together in whorls, forming a nearly continuous spike, with plants reaching up to 90 cm (3.0 ft) tall.
