= Galium xeroticum =

Crimean bedstraw

Scientific classification
- Kingdom: Plantae
- Clade: Tracheophytes
- Clade: Angiosperms
- Clade: Eudicots
- Clade: Asterids
- Order: Gentianales
- Family: Rubiaceae
- Genus: Galium
- Species: G. xeroticum

Binomial name
- Galium xeroticum (Klokov) Pobed.

Synonyms
- Asperula xerotica Klokov; Galium biebersteinii Ehrend.

Species of plant

Galium xeroticum (Commonly known as Crimean Bedstraw) is a species of plant in the family Rubiaceae. It is endemic to the Crimean Peninsula on the north shore of the Black Sea.
