= Allium pervestitum =

Conservation status
- Endangered (IUCN 3.1)

Scientific classification
- Kingdom: Plantae
- Clade: Embryophytes
- Clade: Tracheophytes
- Clade: Spermatophytes
- Clade: Angiosperms
- Clade: Monocots
- Order: Asparagales
- Family: Amaryllidaceae
- Subfamily: Allioideae
- Genus: Allium
- Species: A. pervestitum

Binomial name
- Allium pervestitum Klokov

Species of flowering plant

Allium pervestitum is a species of wild garlic in the family Amaryllidaceae, mainly found growing in the coastal area of the Sea of Azov. It is a halophyte.
