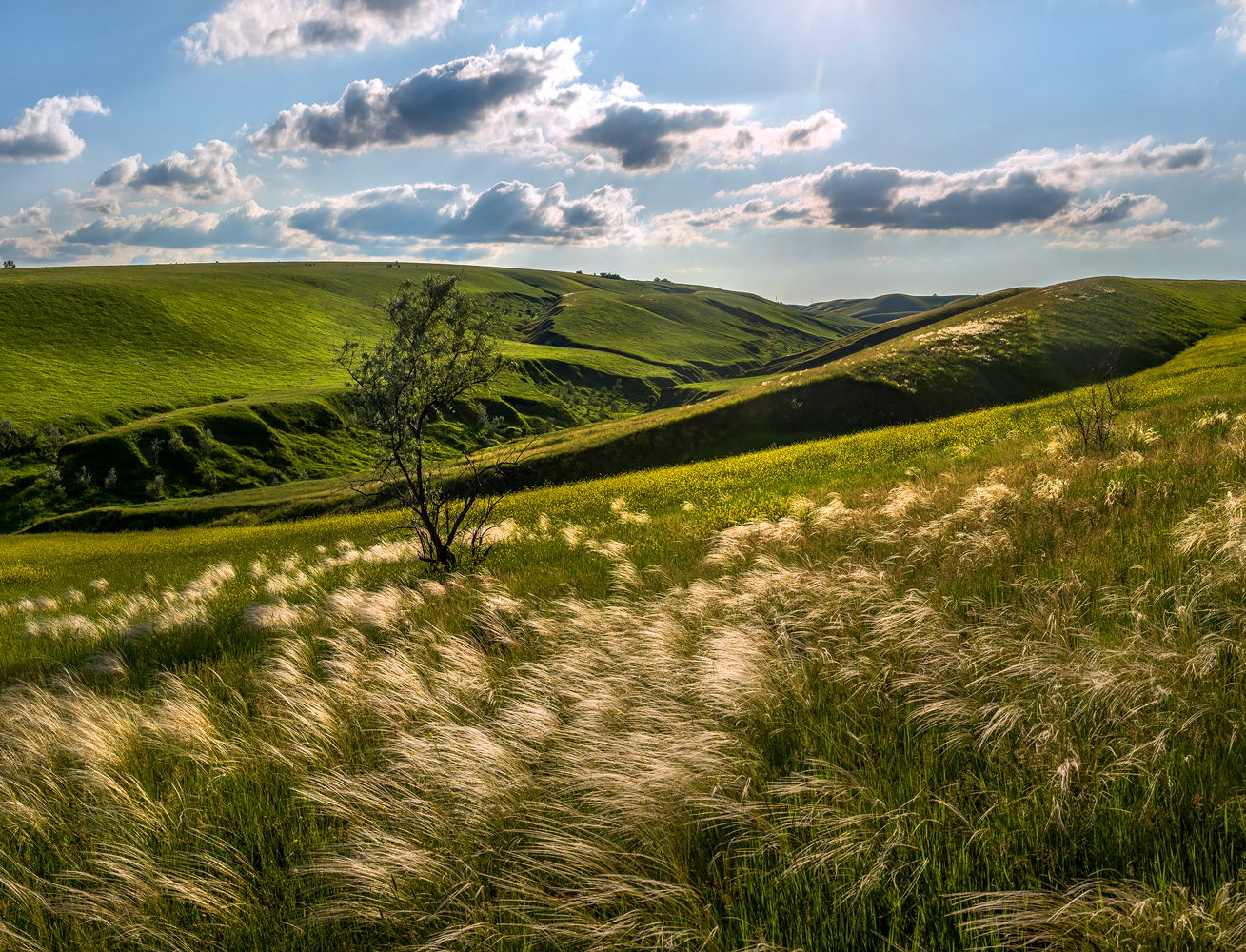
- In Russia

Scientific classification
- Kingdom: Plantae
- Clade: Embryophytes
- Clade: Tracheophytes
- Clade: Spermatophytes
- Clade: Angiosperms
- Clade: Monocots
- Clade: Commelinids
- Order: Poales
- Family: Poaceae
- Subfamily: Pooideae
- Genus: Stipa
- Species: S. lessingiana

Binomial name
- Stipa lessingiana Trin. & Rupr.

Synonyms
- List: Stipa brauneri (Pacz.) Klokov; Stipa cyllenaea Strid; Stipa lessingiana var. brauneri (Pacz.) Roshev.; Stipa lessingiana subsp. brauneri Pacz.; Stipa lessingiana subsp. cyllenaea (Strid) Strid; Stipa lessingiana var. zeberbaueri Hack.; Stipa saikanica Kotukhov

= Stipa lessingiana =

Species of flowering plant

Stipa lessingiana, called Lessing feather grass, is a species of flowering plant in the genus Stipa, found in steppes from Greece east to Mongolia, including the countries bordering the Black and Caspian Seas, Central Asia, western Siberia, the Altai, and Xinjiang in China. It has gained the Royal Horticultural Society's Award of Garden Merit.

== Taxonomy ==
=== Original description ===
The species was first described by Trin and Rupr. in Species Graminum Stipaceorum (1842). The following description is translated from the original Latin protologue:

Panicles reduced, enclosed within the sheath, with branches nearly solitary, bearing 1–2 flowers. Glumes very acuminate, nearly equal. Lemmas 4–5 lines long (≈8–10 mm), densely pubescent with fine hairs up to the apex, nearly twice as long as the glumes. Awn deciduous, glabrous from the base to the node, twisted, obscurely geniculate, then short and erectly plumose, 5–6 inches long (≈12–15 cm). Anthers naked.

Collected in the Orenburg Governorate (Lessing, no. 413).

Habit resembling Stipa arabica var. meyeriana, but with leaves nearly a foot long (≈30 cm), more rigid, reaching the panicle; and the base of the awn up to the node (as in Stipa pennata) completely glabrous. From Stipa pennata it differs by the awns and plume being shorter, not spreading nor divaricate, and also by the floret being pubescent throughout, including up to the apex.

== Images ==
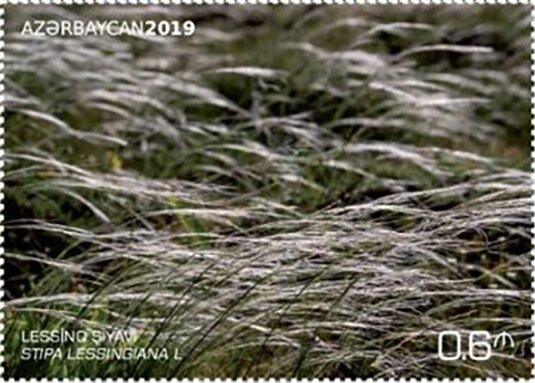
On a 2019 postage stamp of Azerbaijan
