= Kazantyp =

Headland of the Crimean Peninsula

Coordinates: 45°28′N 35°52′E

Designations

Ramsar Wetland
- Official name: Aquatic-cliff complex of Cape Kazantyp
- Designated: 29 July 2004
- Reference no.: 1393

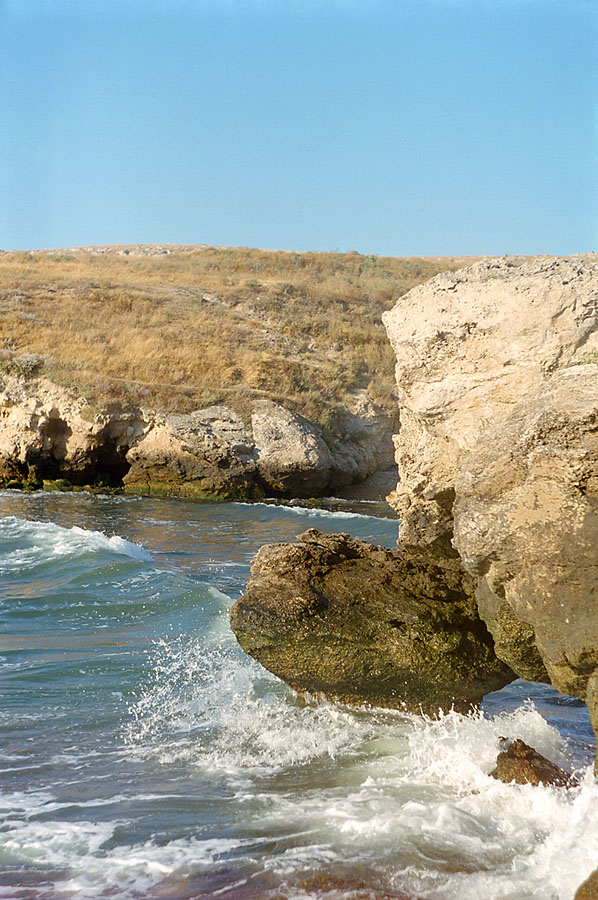
The Kazantip headland.

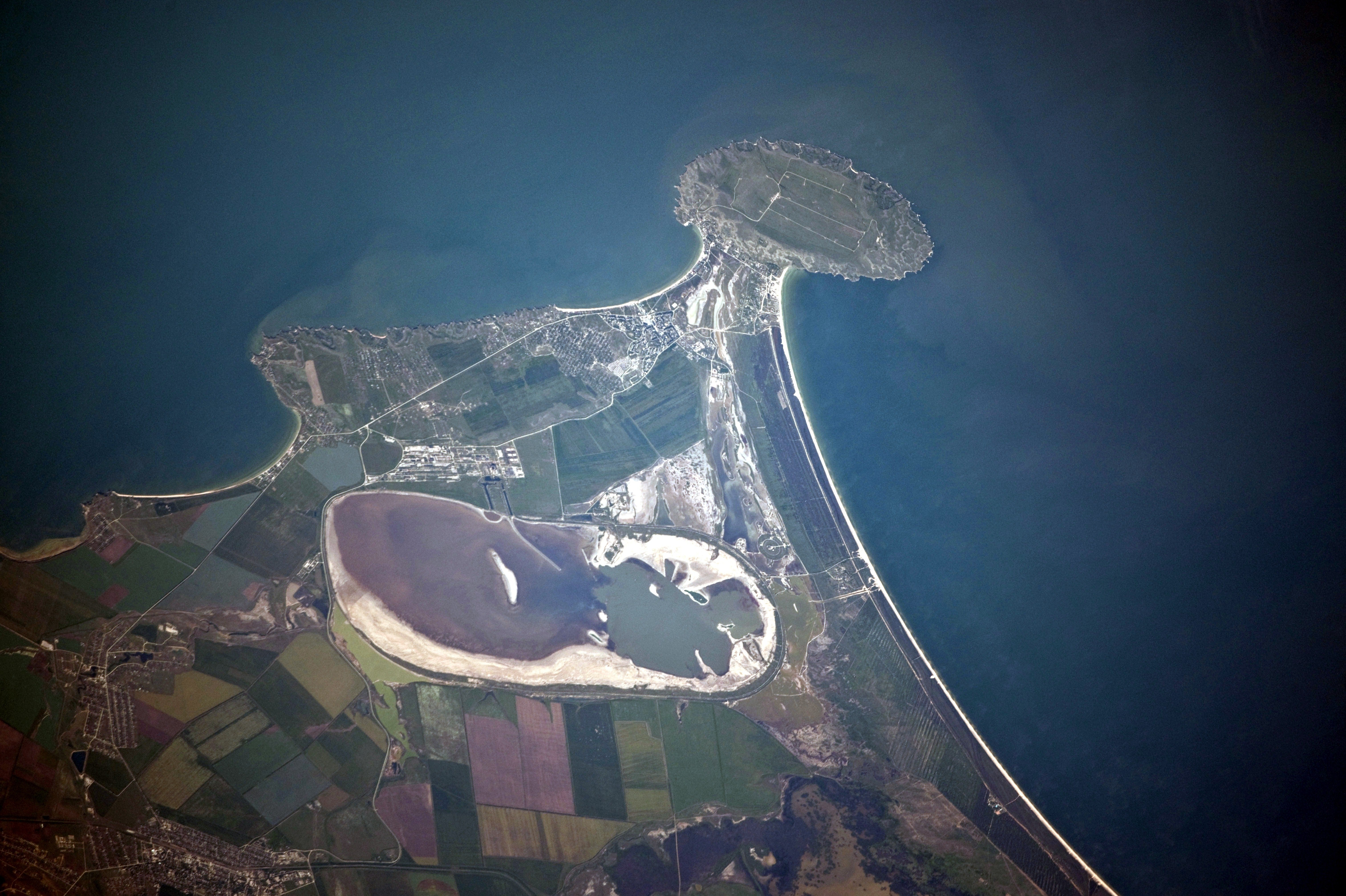
NASA photograph of Kazantyp.

Kazantyp (Казантип or Ukrainian: Казан-Тип, romanized: Kazan-Typ; Russian: Казантип, romanized: Kazantip [kəzɐnʲˈtʲip] or Russian: Казан-Тип, romanized: Kazan-Tip, [kɐˈzantʲɪp]; Crimean Tatar: Qazan Tip) is a headland (or a cape) located in the northeastern part of the Crimean peninsula on the shore of the Azov Sea. The Crimean Tatar name qazan tüp (dialectal qazan tip) means "cauldron's bottom" referring to its concave profile.

== Overview ==
It extends far into the sea from the coastline with its length being about 3–4 km. Its highest point is 107 metres above sea level, with the average being 30–40 metres while its lowest inland point is 20–30 metres above sea level.

The Kazantyp headland is mostly covered with steppe. In 1998 it was designated as Kazantyp Nature Reserve of Ukraine. On the eastern half of the cape are located ancient ruins of a settlement dating back to the 3rd and 2nd centuries BC.

The Kazantyp Lighthouse is located on the headland. From 1995 to 1999, the international electronic music festival, KaZantip, named for the headland, was held nearby.
