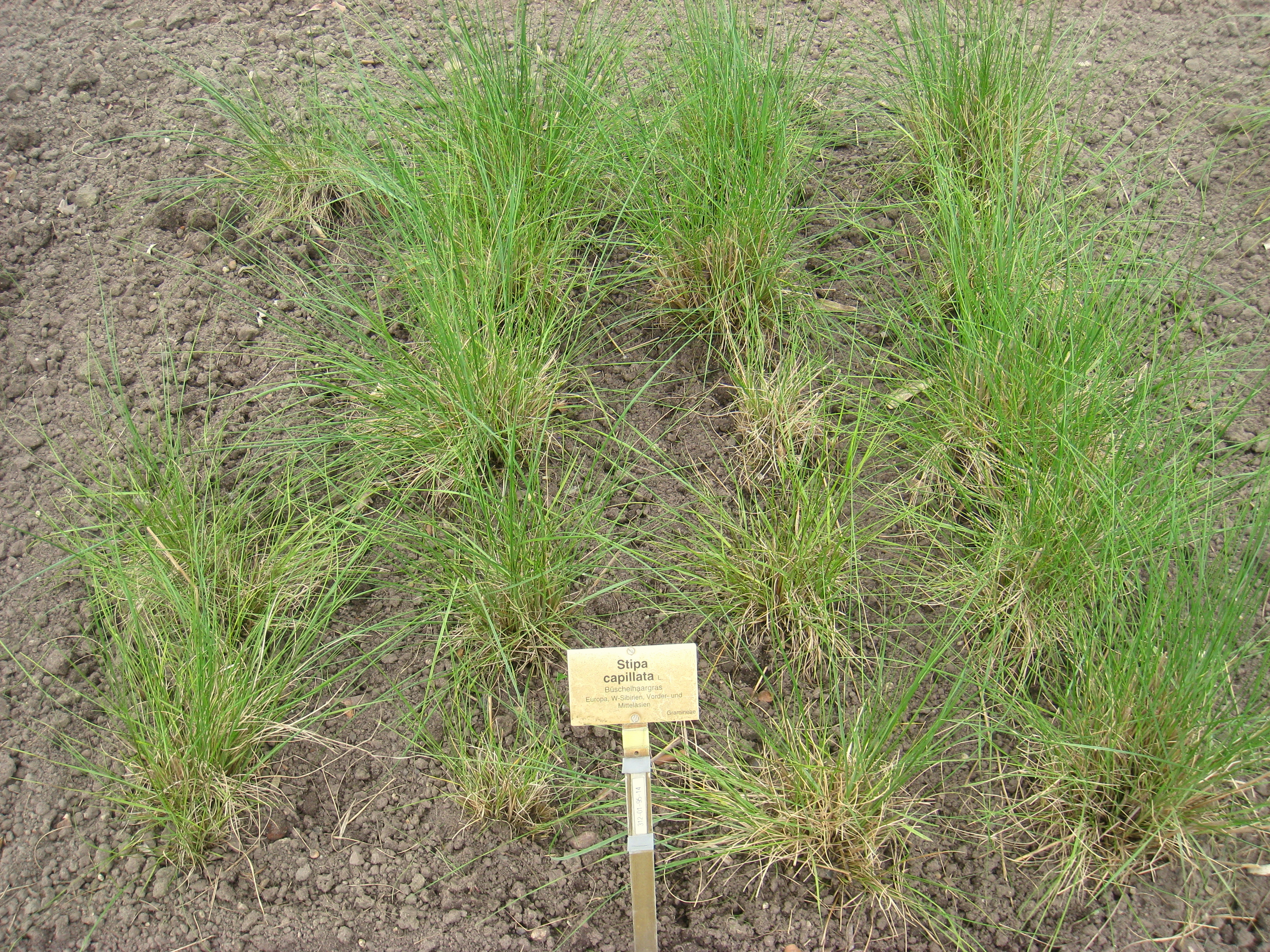

Scientific classification
- Kingdom: Plantae
- Clade: Tracheophytes
- Clade: Angiosperms
- Clade: Monocots
- Clade: Commelinids
- Order: Poales
- Family: Poaceae
- Subfamily: Pooideae
- Genus: Stipa
- Species: S. capillata

Binomial name
- Stipa capillata L.

Synonyms
- Aristida avenacea Houtt.; Stipa capillaris Gromov ex Trautv.; Stipa capillata var. orthopogon Asch. & Graebn.; Stipa capillata f. orthopogon (Asch. & Graebn.) Morariu; Stipa capillata var. rumelica Velen.; Stipa capillata f. ulopogon (Asch. & Graebn.) Morariu; Stipa capillata var. ulopogon Asch. & Graebn.; Stipa erecta Trin.; Stipa juncea Lam.; Stipa juncea var. cabanasii F.M.Vázquez & Devesa; Stipa lagascae Guss.; Stipa thessala Hausskn.; Stipa ucranica Roem. & Schult.; Stipa ukranensis Lam.

= Stipa capillata =

Species of grass

Stipa capillata L. is a perennial bunchgrass species in the family Poaceae, native to Europe and Asia.

S. capillata is a tall steppe grass characterized by its fine, convolute leaves and long, roughened awns. It typically grows in dry, open habitats and is easily recognized by its delicate panicles and glumes that tapers gradually to a narrow tip (attenuate).

== Description ==
Stems reach 20–70(–100) cm in height, with convolute leaves. The lower leaf surface is glabrous but often roughened (tuberculate‑scabrid), while the upper surface bears short hairs up to 6 mm. Leaf sheaths are smooth and longer than the internodes; ligules measure 1–2(–3) mm on basal leaves and 15–20 mm on upper leaves. The panicle is lax with numerous spikelets. Glumes are 25–35 mm and long‑attenuate, lemmas 10–12(–14) mm with a ventral line of hairs reaching the awn base, and awns 12–18(–23) cm, slightly roughened (scabrid).

== Distribution and habitat ==
Stipa capillata is native to southern, south‑central, and southeastern Europe, extending eastward into Russia, Central Asia, and parts of East Asia. It also occurs in the Middle East and western Himalayas. The species has been introduced into the Baltic States. The distribution is summarized in the table below.

Detailed distribution by region and status
Status	Region	Countries / Areas
Native	Europe	Albania; Austria; Bulgaria; Czech Republic; Slovakia; France; Germany; Greece (including Crete); Hungary; Italy (including Sardinia and Sicily); Poland; Romania; Spain; Switzerland; Ukraine; European Türkiye (East Thrace); Crimea (Ukraine); NW Balkan Peninsula (Croatia, Bosnia and Herzegovina, Serbia, Montenegro)
Native	Russia (European & Caucasus)	Central European Russia; East European Russia; South European Russia; North Caucasus; Transcaucasus (Armenia, Azerbaijan, Georgia)
Native	Russia (Siberia & Far East)	Altai Republic; Buryatia; Chita (Zabaykalsky Krai); Irkutsk Oblast; Krasnoyarsk Krai; Tuva Republic; Yakutia (Sakha Republic); West Siberia
Native	Central Asia	Kazakhstan; Kyrgyzstan; Tajikistan; Turkmenistan; Uzbekistan
Native	East Asia	Mongolia; China (North-Central, Xinjiang)
Native	Middle East & South Asia	Iran; Pakistan; West Himalaya (India, Pakistan)
Introduced	Baltic States	Estonia; Latvia; Lithuania
