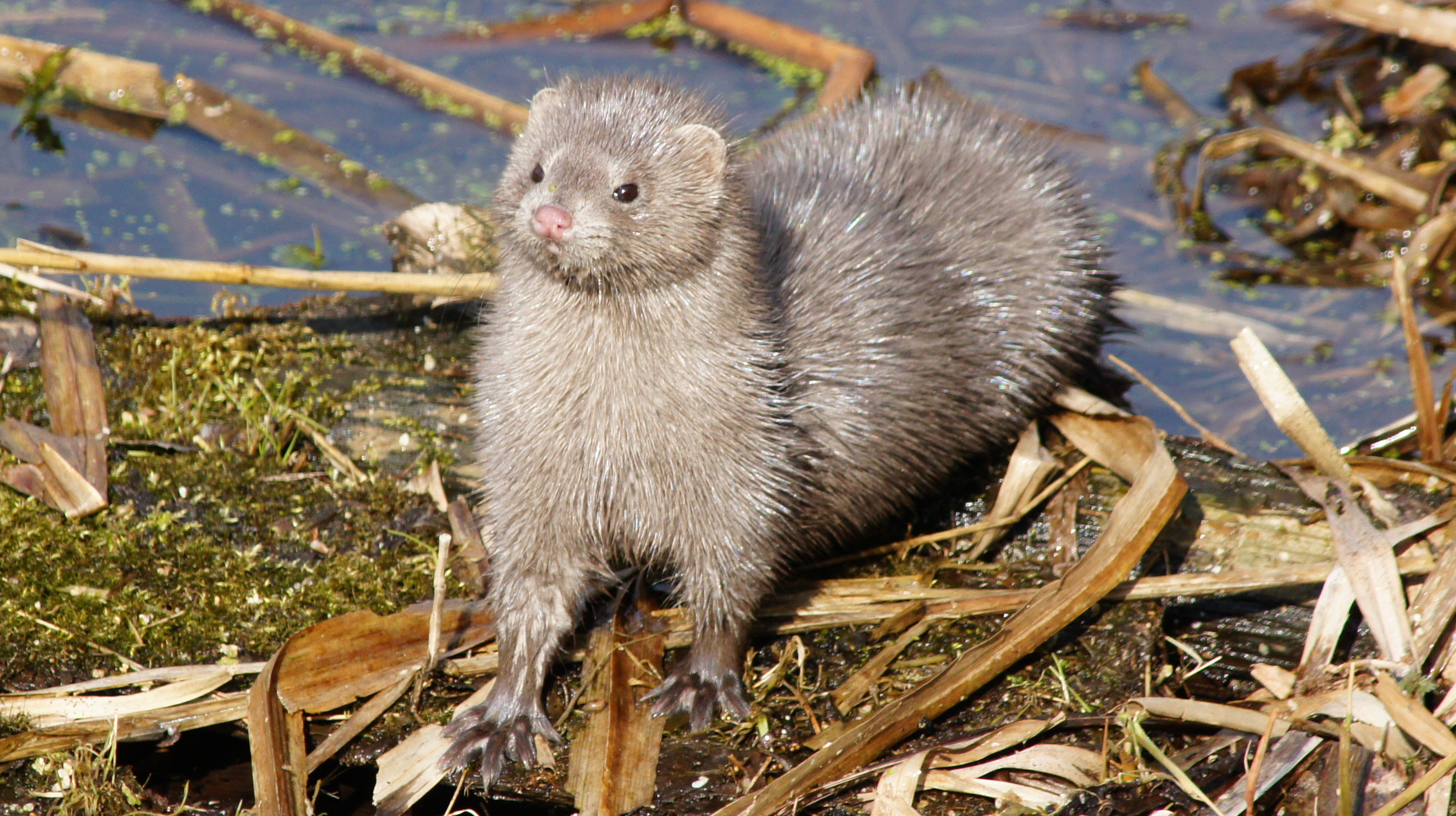

Conservation status
- Domesticated

Scientific classification
- Kingdom: Animalia
- Phylum: Chordata
- Class: Mammalia
- Infraclass: Placentalia
- Order: Carnivora
- Family: Mustelidae
- Genus: Neogale
- Species: N. vison
- Subspecies: N. v. domesticus

Trinomial name
- Neogale vison domesticus Decuypere, 2011

Synonyms
- List: Mustela vison domestica Röhrs, 1986; Neogale vison domestica; Neovison vison domestica; Neovison vison domesticus; Mustela vison domesticus

= Domestic mink =

Domesticated carnivore bred for hunting and pest control

Domestic mink also known as domestic American mink, are a domesticated, carnivorous mammal, bred for hunting and pest control. Domestic mink differ from their wild ancestors, the American mink, in fur colour, size, thicker pelts, and higher tranquility. Domesticated mink come from fur farms, and are the most common animal raised for their fur, with over 50 million farmed annually. Debate has occurred whether the domestic mink is domesticated or not.

Feral mink populations have been introduced worldwide, as several domestic mink have escaped fur farms and established themselves in the wild. Domestic mink are considered an invasive species in Europe, as they are harming several native species such as the European mink, Pyrenean desman, and water voles. Female minks are called sows, males are called boars, and babies are called kits. Domestic mink were initially placed in the genus Mustela, reclassified into Neovison in 2000, and finally Neogale in 2021.

== Taxonomy ==
The domestic mink was given its trinomial name Neogale vison domesticus (then Mustela vison f. domesticus) by Eddy Decuypere in his work Is the Mink Domesticated? from 2011.

Formerly, all mink (including the sea mink) were placed in the genus Mustela. A 2000 study reclassified the domestic mink, American mink, and sea mink into the genus Neovison. A 2021 study into New World weasels determined that the genus Neovison would be merged with Amazon weasel, Colombian weasels and long-tailed weasels to form the new genus Neogale.

Fur-farmed mink are believed to have been descended from the Eastern mink (Neogale vison vison), the Kenai mink (Neogale vison melampeplus), and the Alaskan mink (Neogale vison ingens). A mink's subspecies is mostly based on the location of the fur farm.

=== Domestication debate ===
Debate has occurred whether the domestic mink is a domesticated species. Several animal activists claim that the domestic mink is not domesticated, as they claim the mink are "wild animals kept in captivity". Those who claim the mink is domesticated, on the other hand, support their claim by the differences fur-farmed mink has had over 50 generations. Decuypere's study proved that the mink is domesticated depending on definition.

== History ==
Other mustelids which have been killed for their fur include stoats (starting in the 15th century), sea mink (extinct in the 19th century), and ferrets (common from mid-19th century until the 20th century).

The first records of attempts of mink farming are found around Cassadaga Lakes, New York, during the American Civil War. These attempts were made to provide soldiers with warm clothing for the winter. The first mink fur farming attempts in Canada were done from around 1866 to 1887 by Patterson Bros. in Richmond, Ontario. Mink farming was brought to Europe in the 1920s.

=== Decline of mink farms ===
Since 1969, the number of mink farms in the United States has dropped by 90%. China's numbers have also declined at 90%, though, only this last decade. During the last five years in Finland, numbers have dropped by 50%, and 83% of Finnish people voted for a mink farming ban.

== Range and threats to native wildlife ==
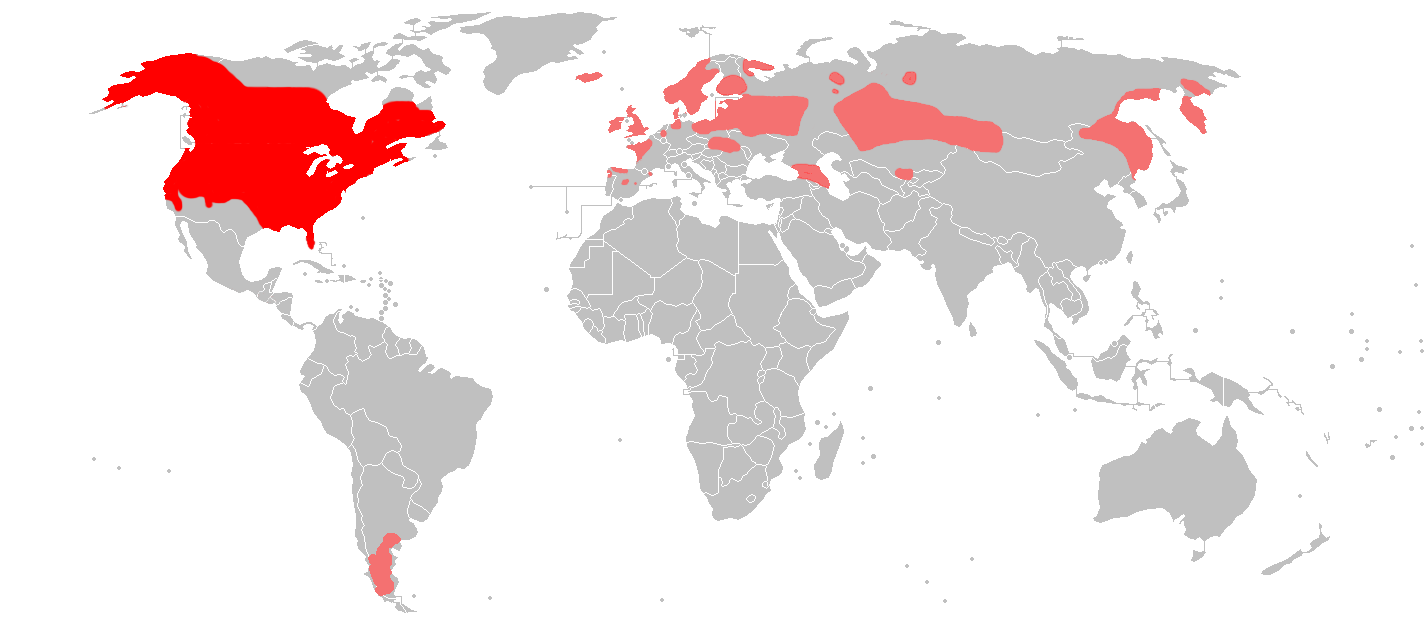
Map showing range of American mink (including wild mink). Native range is red whereas areas introduced are pink.

Domestic mink have been introduced worldwide, as multiple mink have escaped fur farms and established themselves in wild. Wild mink are threatened by domestic mink in the areas of resources for survival and hybridization.

== Characteristics ==
Domestic mink are rather average sized mustelids, with thick fur and in a "skinnymorph" build. They have several differences with their wild counterparts on several aspects. Domestic mink, whose brains are normally smaller by 25% compared to wild mink, can increase their brain size to one similar of wild mink when becoming feral.

=== Comparison with ferrets ===
Domestic mink and ferrets are closely related mustelids both of the weasel subfamily. A 1968 study concluded that while mink eggs cannot be fertilised by ferret sperm, a ferret's egg can be fertilised if there is a high number of mink sperm. Owning a pet mink is very different from owning a ferret; mink have been domesticated for their fur, while ferrets have been domesticated as pets.

=== Colours ===
Domestic mink come in different colours due to selective breeding. Numbers have increased over the last years. In 2008, a study listed that there are 35 fur colours. A 2019 study determined there are over 100 colours of mink. Colours range from a white "albino" colour to a dark, black-looking colour.

== Diet ==
Domestic mink are carnivores, and form part of carnivora like other mustelids. Mink are fed fish, cow, pigs, and chicken in fur farms. These are parts of food that humans don't eat.

== See also ==
- Mink industry in Denmark
- Animal language
- List of domesticated animals
