= South American weasel =

Scientific classification
- Kingdom: Animalia
- Phylum: Chordata
- Class: Mammalia
- Order: Carnivora
- Family: Mustelidae
- Genus: Neogale
- Subgenus: Grammogale; Cabrera, 1940

Type species
- Mustela africana Desmarest, 1818

Species
- Neogale africana; Neogale felipei
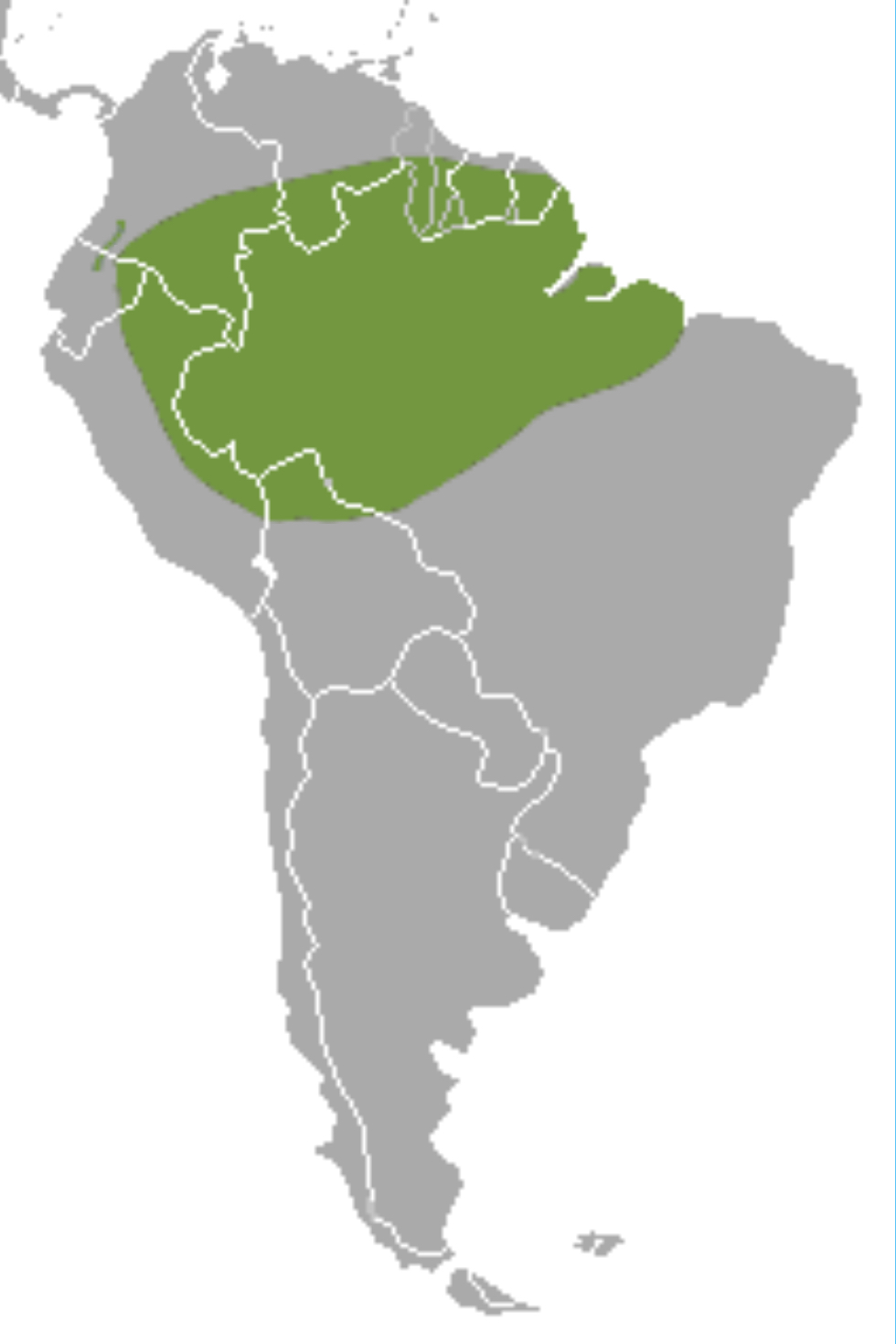
- Distribution of Grammogale in South America

Subgenus of mammals

South American weasels (subgenus Grammogale) are New World weasels endemic to South America. There are two extant species—the Amazon weasel (Neogale africana) and the Colombian weasel (Neogale felipei).

== Taxonomy ==
New World weasels

- Mustelinae
  - - - Grammogale
        - Neogale africana
        - Neogale felipei
    - Neogale frenata
  - - Neogale vison
    - Neogale macrodon

Relations of Grammogale within Neogale

The Amazon weasel was the first species of the two which was described, as it was described by Anselme Gaëtan Desmarest in 1818. Spanish naturalist Ángel Cabrera described Grammogale in 1940 as a monotypic subgenus, though this would change in 1978 when the Colombian weasel was first described. Grammogale was originally one of five subgenera in the genus Mustela (the other four Lutreola, Mustela, Putorius, and Vison). South American weasels were reclassified into the genus Neogale with their closest relatives (the American mink, the long-tailed weasel and the sea mink) in 2021.

South American weasels are the result of a second migration of Mustelinae into South America (the first being long-tailed weasels in the late Pliocene).

== Characteristics ==
As with most New World weasels, South American weasels have an elongated, slender, body shape with small ears and legs. Typically, species of South American weasels have a dark brown fur colour, though some Amazon weasels may have a reddish brown colour.
