= Stolzmann's Pacific iguana =

Two species of lizard are named Stolzmann's Pacific iguana:

- Liolaemus reichei
- Liolaemus stolzmanni
