= Stolzmann's lizard =

Two species of lizard are named Stolzmann's lizard:

- Liolaemus reichei
- Liolaemus stolzmanni
