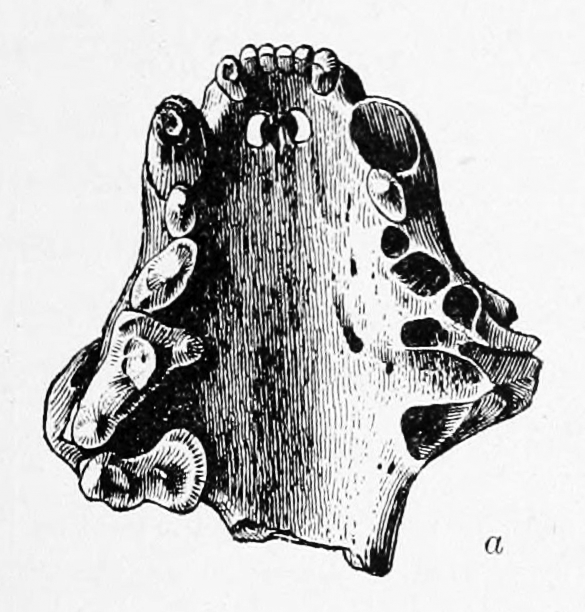
- Palatal aspect of the skull from the type specimen

Conservation status
- Extinct (1894) (IUCN 3.1)

- Presumed Extinct (1894) (NatureServe)

Scientific classification
- Kingdom: Animalia
- Phylum: Chordata
- Class: Mammalia
- Order: Carnivora
- Family: Mustelidae
- Genus: Neogale
- Species: †N. macrodon

Binomial name
- †Neogale macrodon (Prentiss, 1903)
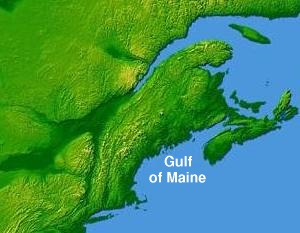
- The sea mink was found in the hub Gulf of Maine area.

Synonyms
- List: †Lutreola vison antiquus Loomis, 1911; †Mustela macrodon; †Mustela vison macrodon; †Neovison vison macrodon; †Neovison macrodon

= Sea mink =

Sea mink Temporal range: Late Holocene

Extinct species of mammal from North America

The sea mink (Neogale macrodon) is a recently extinct species of mink that lived on the eastern coast of North America around the Gulf of Maine on the New England seaboard. It was most closely related to the American mink (Neogale vison), with continuing debate about whether or not the sea mink should be considered a subspecies of the American mink (as Neogale vison macrodon) or a species of its own. The main justification for a separate species designation is the size difference between the two minks, but other distinctions have been made, such as its redder fur. The only known remains are bone fragments unearthed in Native American shell middens. Its actual size is speculative, based largely on tooth remains.

The sea mink was first described in 1903, after its extinction; information regarding its external appearance and habits stem from speculation and from accounts made by fur traders and Native Americans. It may have exhibited behavior similar to the American mink, in that it probably maintained home ranges, was polygynandrous, and had a similar diet, though more seaward-oriented. It was probably found on the New England coast and the Maritime Provinces, though its range may have stretched further south during the last glacial period. Conversely, its range may have been restricted solely to the New England coast, specifically the Gulf of Maine, or just to the nearby islands. The largest of the minks, the sea mink was more desirable to fur traders and became extinct in the late 19th or early 20th century.

== Taxonomy and etymology ==
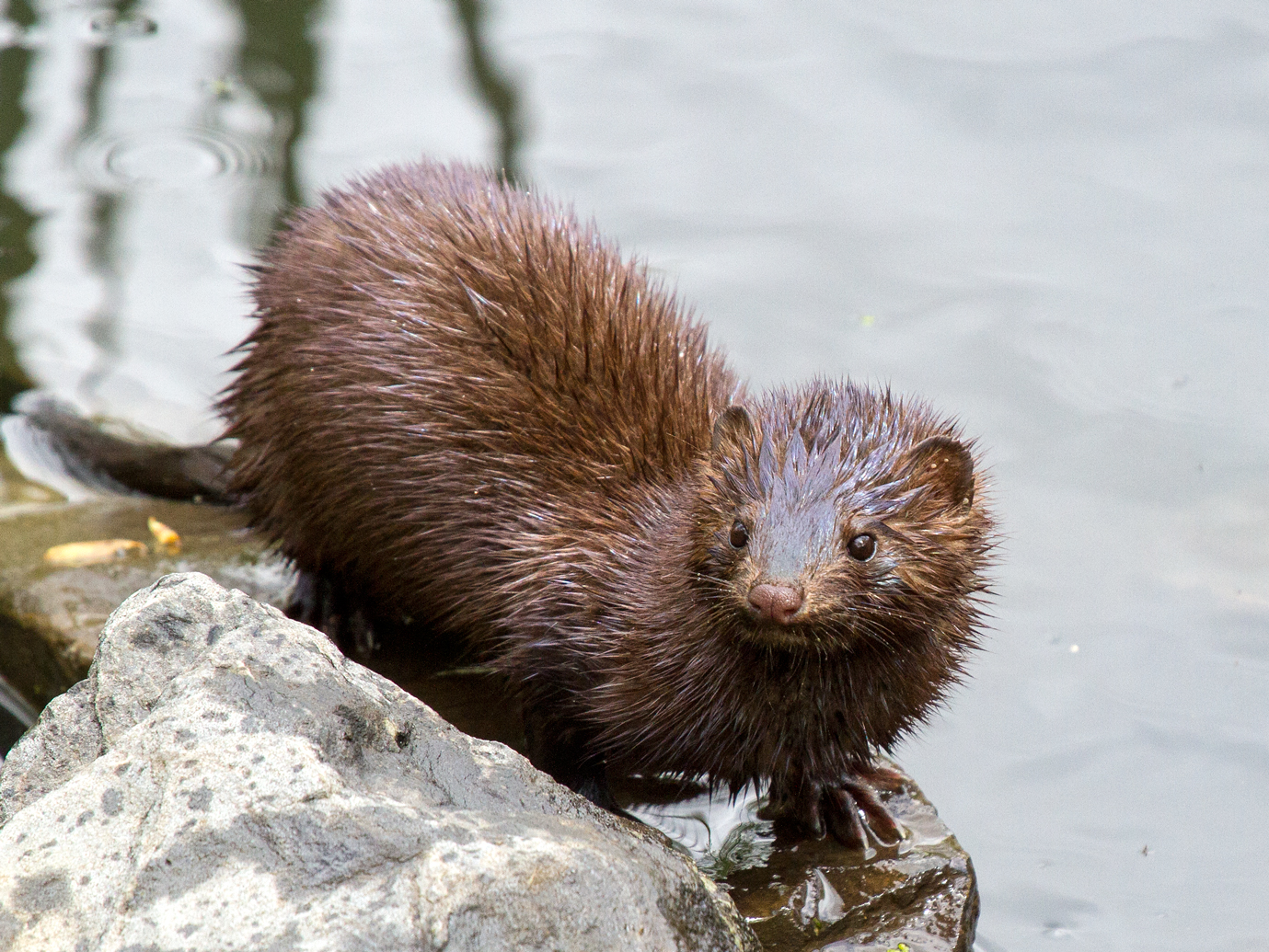
The closely related American mink (Neogale vison)

The sea mink was first described as Lutreola macrodon, distinct from the American mink, by Daniel Webster Prentiss, a medical doctor and ornithologist, in 1903, after it became extinct. Prentiss based his description on skull fragments recovered from Native American shell middens in New England. Most sea mink remains, nearly all of them skull fragments, have come from shell middens, but a complete specimen has never been found.

Debate has occurred regarding whether the sea mink was its own species, or another subspecies of the American mink. Those who argue that the sea mink was a subspecies often refer to it as Neovison vison macrodon. A study in 1911 by Frederic Brewster Loomis, an American paleontologist, concluded that the differences between the American mink and the sea mink were too minute to justify the latter's classification as a separate species, and he named it Lutreola vison antiquus. A study conducted in 2000 by Mead et al. refuted Loomis by claiming that the size range for the largest sea mink specimen was beyond that of the American mink, thereby making it a separate species. But a 2001 study by Graham concluded that this size difference was insufficient evidence to classify the sea mink as its own species and that it should be considered a subspecies. Graham supposed that the size difference was caused by environmental factors. Furthermore, Graham reported that Mead assumed the smaller mink specimens to be the American mink, and the larger mink specimens outside the range of the American mink to be sea minks; this may have been a case of sexual dimorphism wherein all specimens were sea minks, the larger ones being males and the smaller ones being females. A 2007 study compared the dental makeup of the sea mink to the American mink, and concluded that they were distinct enough to be considered two separate species.

New World weasels

- Mustelinae
  - - - Neogale africana
      - Neogale felipei
    - Neogale frenata
  - - Neogale vison
    - Neogale macrodon

Relations of the sea mink within Mustelinae

The taxonomy of the minks was revised in 2000, resulting in the formation of a new genus, Neovison, which includes only the sea mink and the American mink. Formerly, both minks were classified in the genus Mustela. The species name macrodon translates to "large teeth". According to Richard Manville, a naturalist who maintains that the sea mink is not a separate species, its closest relative is the common mink (N. v. mink), which also inhabits the New England area. A 2021 study into New World weasels found that the sea mink, along with four other extant species, should be classified into a new genus, Neogale.

Fur traders who hunted it gave the sea mink various names, including water marten, red otter, and fisher cat. Possibly the first description of this species was made by Sir Humphrey Gilbert in the late 1500s as "a fish like a greyhound", which was a reference to its affinity for the sea and its body shape and gait, which were apparently similar to that of a greyhound. It is possible that the fisher (Pekania pennanti) got its name from being mistakenly identified as the sea mink, which was also known as the fisher by fur traders. The Abenaki Indians referred to it as the "mousebeysoo", which means "wet thing". It was named "sea mink" because it was always found near the coast by fur traders, and subsequently the American mink was often referred to as the "woods mink".

== Range ==
The sea mink was a marine mammal that lived around the rocky coasts of New England and the southernmost Maritime Provinces until it was hunted to extinction in the late 19th or early 20th century. Most sea mink remains are unearthed on the coast of Maine. Though it is speculated that they at one point inhabited Connecticut and Rhode Island, they were commonly trapped along the coast of the Bay of Fundy (in the Gulf of Maine), and it is said that they formerly existed on the southwestern coast of Nova Scotia. There were reports of unusually large mink furs being collected from Nova Scotia regularly. The bones of a specimen unearthed in Middleboro, Massachusetts, were dated to be around 4,300±300 years old, 19 kilometers (12 mi) from salt water. The sea mink may have reached that area by traveling up rivers, or may have been brought there by Native Americans. The latter is most likely, as no other mink remains have been discovered between Casco Bay in Maine and southeastern Massachusetts. Sea mink bones have been unearthed in Canada, although these may have been carried there by Native Americans from the Gulf of Maine. The rugged shorelines of the Down East region of Maine may have represented a northernmost barrier in their range. Mead concluded that only American minks inhabited the mainland and that sea minks were restricted to islands off the coast. If this is the case, then all remains found on the mainland were carried there. Graham challenged that hypothesis, stating that it is unlikely that all sea mink specimens originate from one population.

During the last glacial period, ending 12,000 years ago, the sea mink's range may have extended south of the Gulf of Maine. It may have even evolved there, as Maine at that time would have been covered in glaciers, although the oldest known specimen only dates back to around 5,000 years; this could be due to the rising sea levels—older sea mink remains may be submerged underwater. Alternately, the sea mink may have evolved after the last glacial period and filled a new ecological niche.

== Description ==
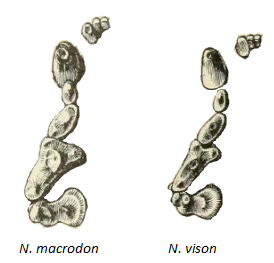
Dentition from the upper jaw of the sea mink (left) and the American mink (right)

Since the sea mink has only been described by fragmentary remains, its appearance and behaviors are not well-documented. Its relatives, as well as descriptions by fur traders and Native Americans, give a general idea of this animal's appearance and its ecological roles. Accounts from Native Americans in the New England/Atlantic Canadian regions reported that the sea mink had a fatter body than the American mink. The sea mink produced a distinctive fishy odor, and had fur that was said to be coarser and redder than that of the American mink. It is thought that naturalist Joseph Banks encountered this animal in 1776 in the Strait of Belle Isle, and he described it as being slightly larger than a fox, having long legs, and a tail that was long and tapered toward the end, similar to a greyhound.

The sea mink was the largest of the minks. As only fragmentary skeletal remains of the sea mink exist, most of its external measurements are speculative and rely only on dental measurements. In 1929, Ernest Thompson Seton, a wildlife artist, concluded that the probable dimensions for this animal are 91.4 centimeters (36 in) from head to tail, with the tail being 25.4 centimeters (10 in) long. A possible mounted sea mink specimen collected in 1894 in Connecticut measured 72 centimeters (28 in) from head to tail and the tail was 25.4 centimeters (10 in) in length; a 1966 study found this to be either a large American mink or possibly a hybrid. The specimen was described as having coarse fur that was reddish-tan in color, though much of it was likely faded from age. It was darkest at the tail and the hind limbs, with a 5-by-1.5-centimeter (2 by 0.6 in) white patch between the forearms. There were also white spots on the left forearm and the groin region.

The type specimen was collected by Prentiss and Frederick True, a biologist, in 1897 in Brooklin, Maine, the remains of which consist of a maxilla, parts of the nasal bone, and the palate. The teeth are all present on the right side of the palate, and the left side consists of the incisors and one premolar. Other than a chipped canine, all the teeth are in good condition. The specimen is apparently larger than the Alaskan mink (N. v. nesolestes), as the average distance between the last incisor to the first molar is 2.8 centimeters (1.1 in) in the Alaskan mink, whereas that distance is 3 centimeters (1.2 in) in the type specimen. The nasal bone has an abrupter ascension, and the carnassial teeth make a more acute angle with the gums than those of the common mink (N. v. mink).

These minks were large and heavily built, with a low sagittal crest and short, wide postorbital processes (projections on the frontal bone behind the eye sockets). In fact, the most notable characteristic of the skull was its size, in that it was clearly larger than that of other mink species, having a wide rostrum, large nostril openings, large antorbital foramina (openings in the skull in front of the eye socket), and large teeth. Their large size was probably in response to their coastal environment, as the largest extant subspecies of American mink, the Alaskan mink (N. v. nesolestes), inhabits the Alexander Archipelago in Alaska, an area with a habitat similar to the Gulf of Maine. Mead, concluding that the mink was restricted to nearshore islands, suggested that the large size was due to insular gigantism. Since almost all members of the subfamily Mustelinae exhibit sexual dimorphism, male sea minks were probably larger than female sea minks. The sea mink's wider carnassial teeth and blunter carnassial blades suggest that they crushed hard shells more often than did the teeth of the American mink.

== Behavior ==
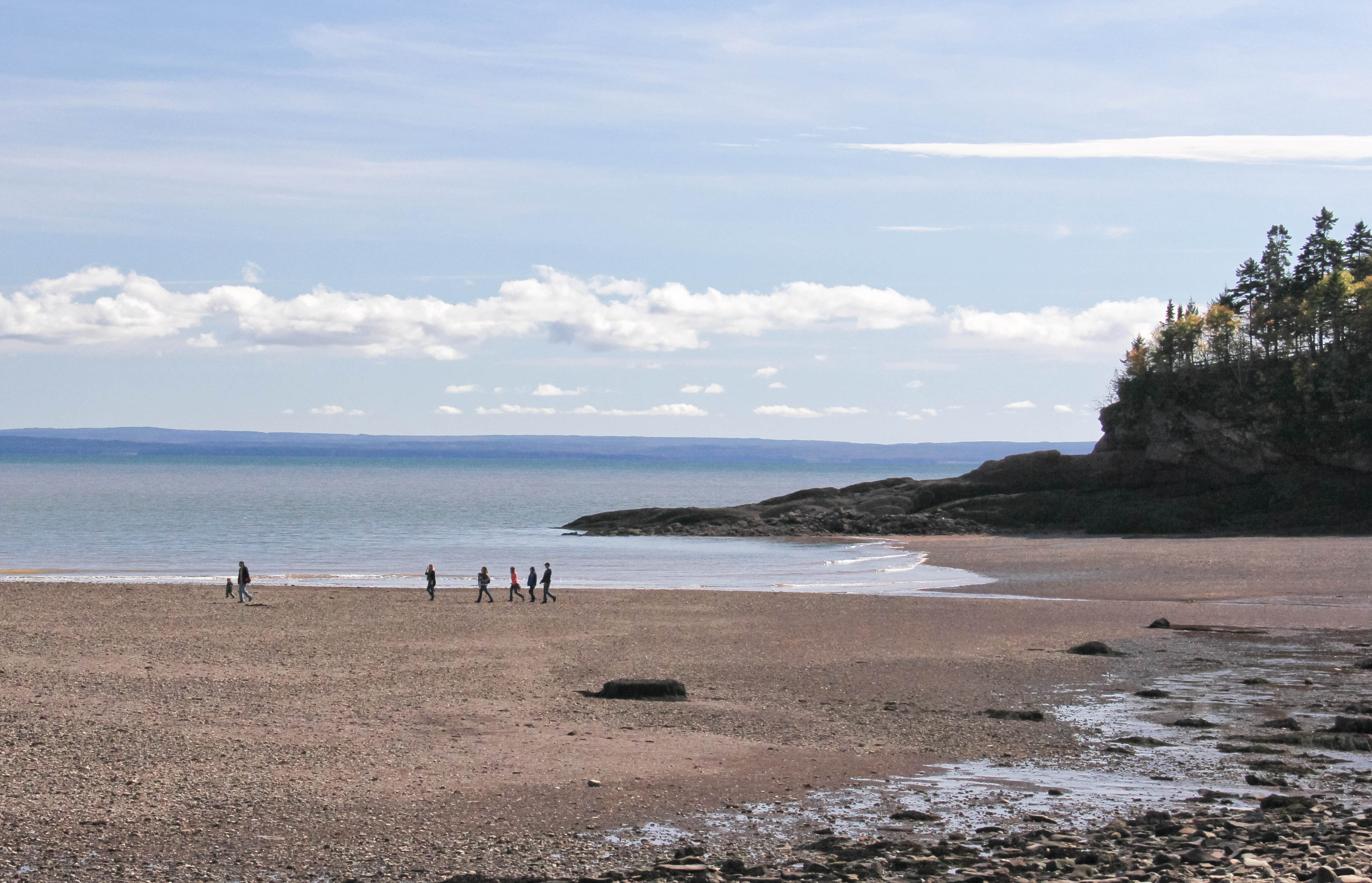
The sea mink was an intertidal predator of the Gulf of Maine.

Although not a truly marine species, being confined to coastal waters, the sea mink was unusually aquatic compared to other members of Musteloidea, being, next to otters, the most aquatic member of the taxon. As marine mammal species often play a large part in their ecosystems, the sea mink could have been an important intertidal predator. It may have had a similar diet to the American mink, consuming seabirds, seabird eggs, and hard-bodied marine invertebrates, though in greater proportions. Its seafood-oriented diet may have increased its size. Remains of toad sculpins and ocean pout were the most common around their dens, and garden banded snails were also reported to have been part of their diet.

According to fur traders, the sea mink was nocturnal and resided in caves and rock crevices during the day. It reportedly made a den with two entrances in the rocks piled up by the waves. Like other minks, individual sea minks may have maintained home ranges, and since the males were larger and required more food, males would have had larger territorial claims. Likewise, their larger size may have allowed the males to target larger prey than the females, and they may have had to defend females during mating seasons. Like other weasels, the sea mink was probably polygynandrous, with both sexes mating with multiple individuals. Due to the overlap of American mink and sea mink ranges, it is possible that they hybridized with each other.

== Exploitation and extinction ==
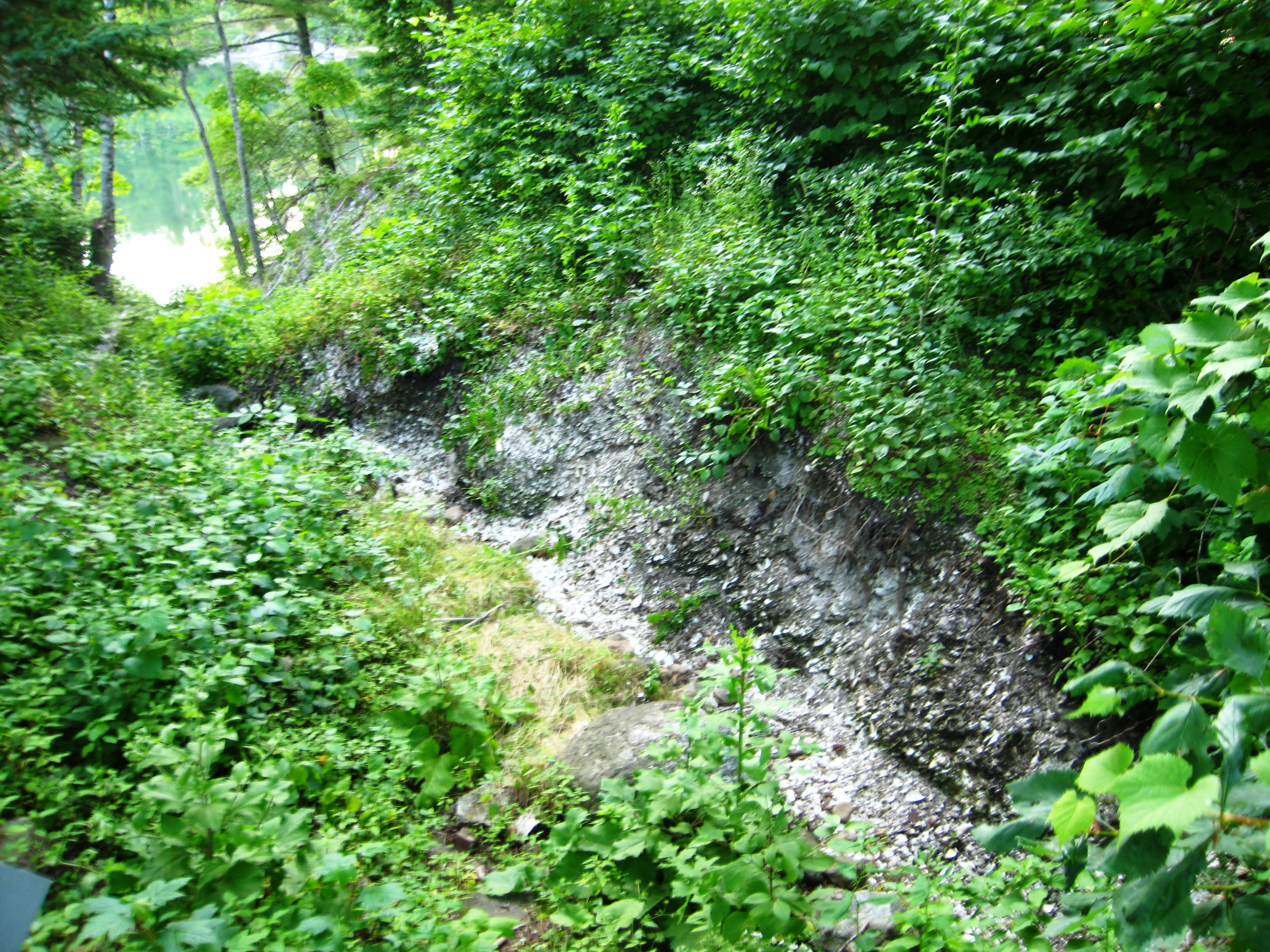
The Whaleback Shell Midden in Maine

The sea mink was pursued by fur traders due to its large size; this made it more desirable than other mink species further inland. The unregulated fur trade eventually led to its extinction, which is thought to have occurred between 1860 and 1920. The sea mink was seldom sighted after 1860. The last two recorded kills of a sea mink were made in Maine in 1880 near Jonesport, Maine, and Campobello Island, New Brunswick, in 1894, although the 1894 kill is speculated to be of large American minks. Fur traders made traps to catch sea minks and also pursued them with dogs, although they were rarely trapped. If a sea mink escaped into a small hole on the rocky ledges, it was dug out by hunters using shovels and crowbars. If it was out of reach of the hunters, it was shot and then retrieved using an iron rod with a screw on the far end. If it was hiding, it was smoked out and suffocated. The minks' nocturnal behavior may have been caused from pressure by fur traders who hunted them in daylight.

Since the remains of brain cases found in shell middens are broken and many of the bones found exhibit cut marks, it is assumed that the sea mink was hunted by Native Americans for food, and possibly for exchange and ceremonial purposes. One study looking at the remains in shell middens in Penobscot Bay reported that sea mink craniums were intact, more so than that of other animals found, implying that they were specifically placed there. Males were more often collected than females.
