= Jan Sztolcman =

Polish ornithologist (1854–1928)

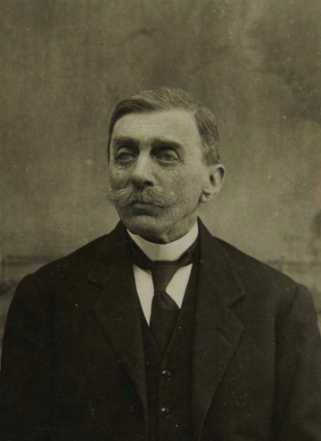
- Picture of Sztolcman from the 1920s
- Born: November 19, 1854; Warsaw, Congress Poland
- Died: April 29, 1928 (aged 73); Warsaw, Poland
- Education: University of Warsaw
- Occupations: Zoologist, explorer and ornithologist

Jan Stanisław Sztolcman (sometimes referred to as Jean Stanislaus Stolzmann) (19 November 1854, Warsaw – 28 April 1928, Warsaw) was a Polish zoologist, ornithologist and collector naturalist who travelled extensively in South America. He was also a promoter of conservation and worked to prevent the European bison from going extinct.

== Biography ==
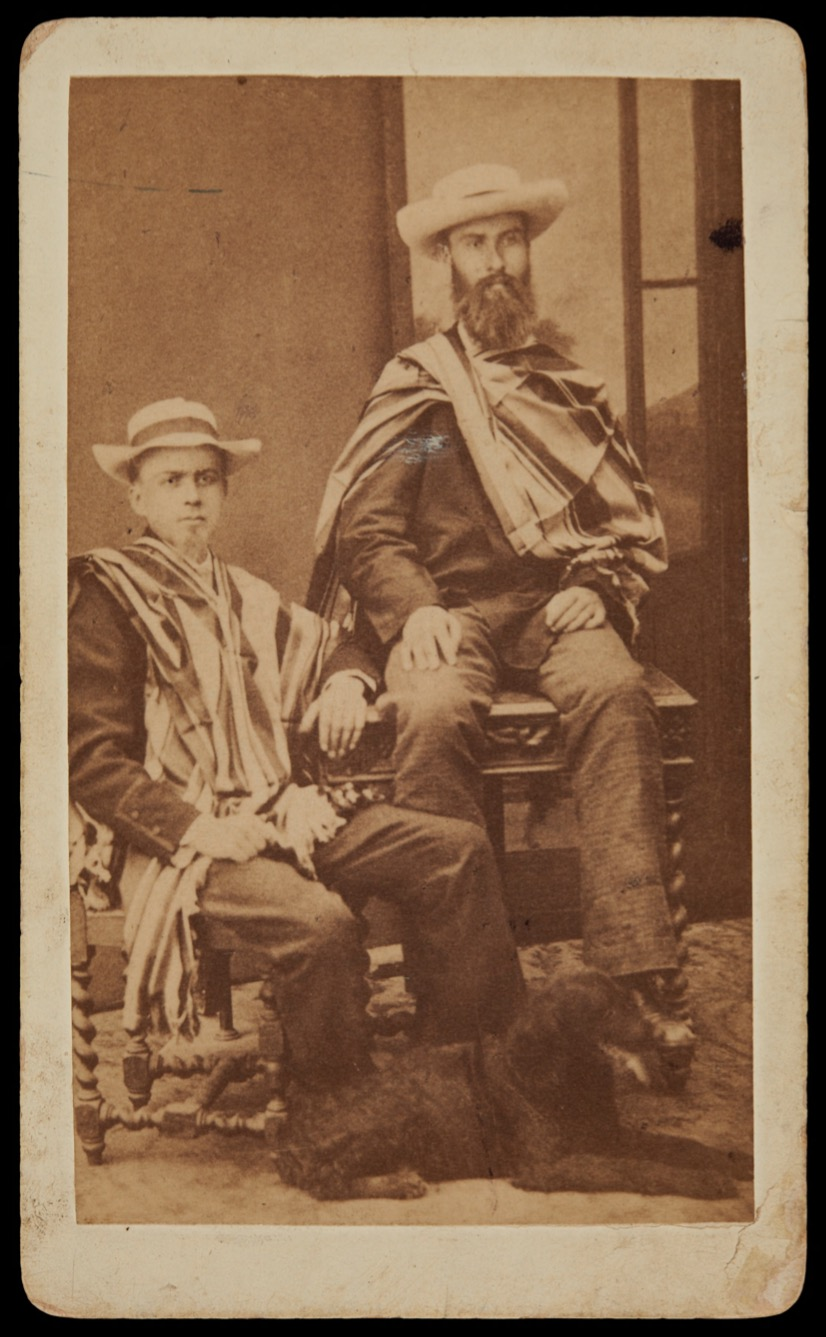
Jan Sztolcman, Józef Siemiradzki and dog in Ecuador in 1883

Sztolcman was born in Warsaw and went to the 3rd Gymnasium. At an early age he was influenced by the travel writings of Gustave Aymard, Thomas Mayne Reid and the fiction of Jules Verne. Beginning in 1872, Sztolcman studied zoology at the Imperial University of Warsaw. He worked on the cabinet of Władysław Taczanowski and from 1875 to 1882, he joined Konstanty Jelski to collect zoological specimens in South America, primarily in Peru, and from 1882 to 1884, he lived and worked in Ecuador. He collected several hundred species of birds from South America, with some of the specimens being little known or entirely unknown to European ornithologists. In 1884, he returned to Warsaw, where in 1887 he was appointed director of the newly founded Branicki zoological museum. He also held the position of professor of geology and paleontology. In 1899 he founded the periodical Łowiec Polski that he edited until his death. In 1901 he went to Sudan with Jozef Potocki. From 1924 he lectured on hunting at the Warsaw University of Life Sciences and at the Forestry school in Łowicz. At the International Congress for Nature Conservation in 1923 he proposed a Polish project to save the European bison which was based on the American Bison Society and its work.

== Eponyms ==
Sztolcman described a number of bird taxa but many other specimens he collected in other groups were named by specialists in his honour with the specific epithet of stolzmanni. For example, two species of lizard are named in his honor: Liolaemus stolzmanni and Microlophus stolzmanni. Other taxa include Chlorothraupis stolzmanni, Catharus dryas sztolcmani, Oreotrochilus stolzmanni, Papilio glaucolaus sztolcmani, Mustela stolzmanni, Hydrometra sztolcmani, Nenia sztolcmani, and Campylaea sztolcmani.

== Written works ==
Among Sztolcman's written works is a 1926 treatise on the European bison, titled Żubr, jego historia, obyczaje i przyszłość (The wisent, its history, behavior and future). He was the founding editor of the magazine Łowiec Polski. Other significant works by Sztolcman are:

- Ornitologia łowiecka (1905) – Ornithological hunting.
- Wspomnienia z podróży (volumes 1, 2); (1912) – Memoirs of the journey.
- Szkice ornitologiczne (1916) – Ornithological sketches.
