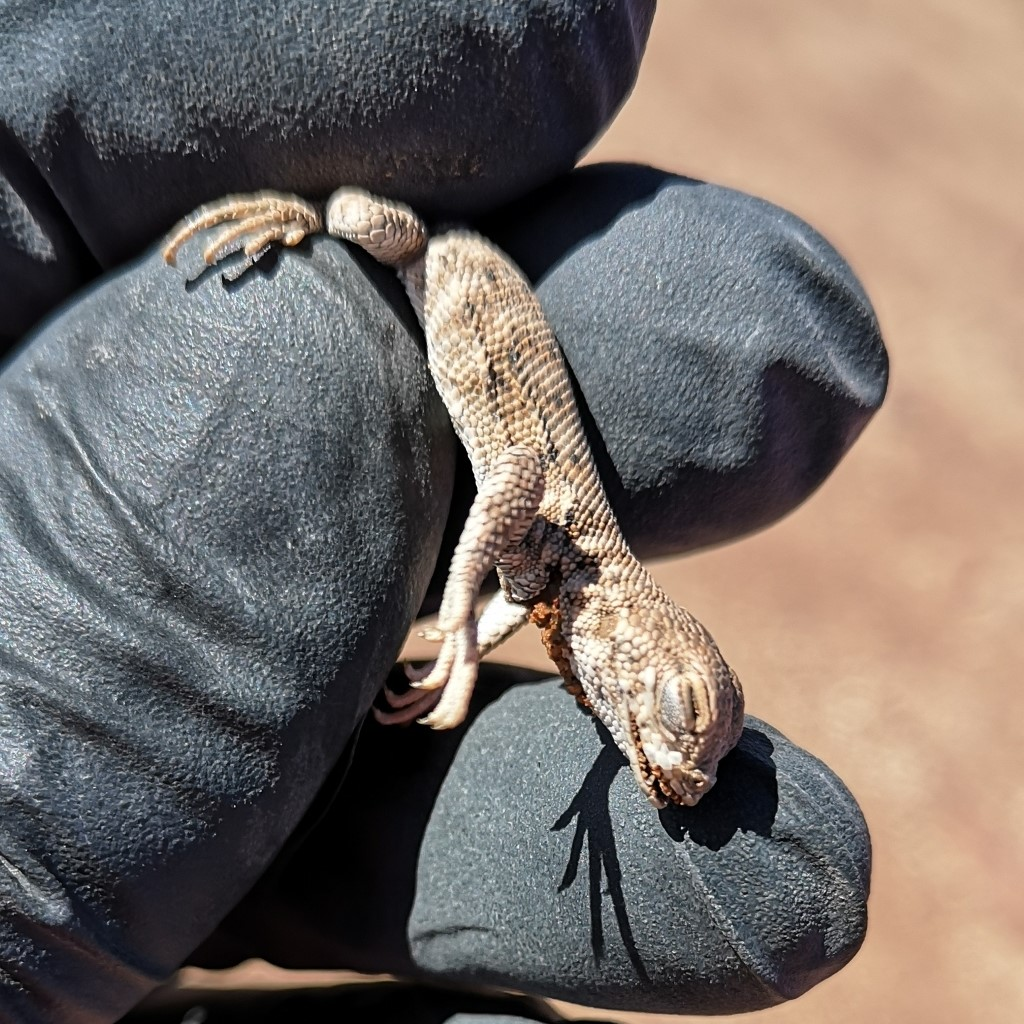

Conservation status
- Endangered (IUCN 3.1)

Scientific classification
- Kingdom: Animalia
- Phylum: Chordata
- Class: Reptilia
- Order: Squamata
- Suborder: Iguania
- Family: Liolaemidae
- Genus: Liolaemus
- Species: L. stolzmanni

Binomial name
- Liolaemus stolzmanni (Steindachner, 1891)

Synonyms
- Ctenoblepharis stolzmanni Steindachner, 1891; Phrynosaura reichei F. Werner, 1907; Ceiolaemus reichei Laurent, 1984; Phrynosaura stolzmanni Carrillo de Espinoza & Icochea, 1995; Liolaemus stolzmanni Núñez & Veloso, 2001

= Liolaemus stolzmanni =

Species of reptile

Liolaemus stolzmanni, commonly known as Stolzmann's Pacific iguana, is a species of lizard in the family Liolaemidae.

== Etymology ==
The specific name, stolzmanni, is in honor of Polish zoologist Jean Stanislas Stolzmann.

== Distribution ==
Liolaemus stolzmanni is endemic to Chile, with occurrence noted in the Chilean matorral. Reports from Peru instead represent either Liolaemus pachecoi, Liolaemus poconchilensis, or an undescribed species.

== Reproduction ==
Liolaemus stolzmanni is viviparous.
