= Stump grinder =

Machine used for removing tree stumps

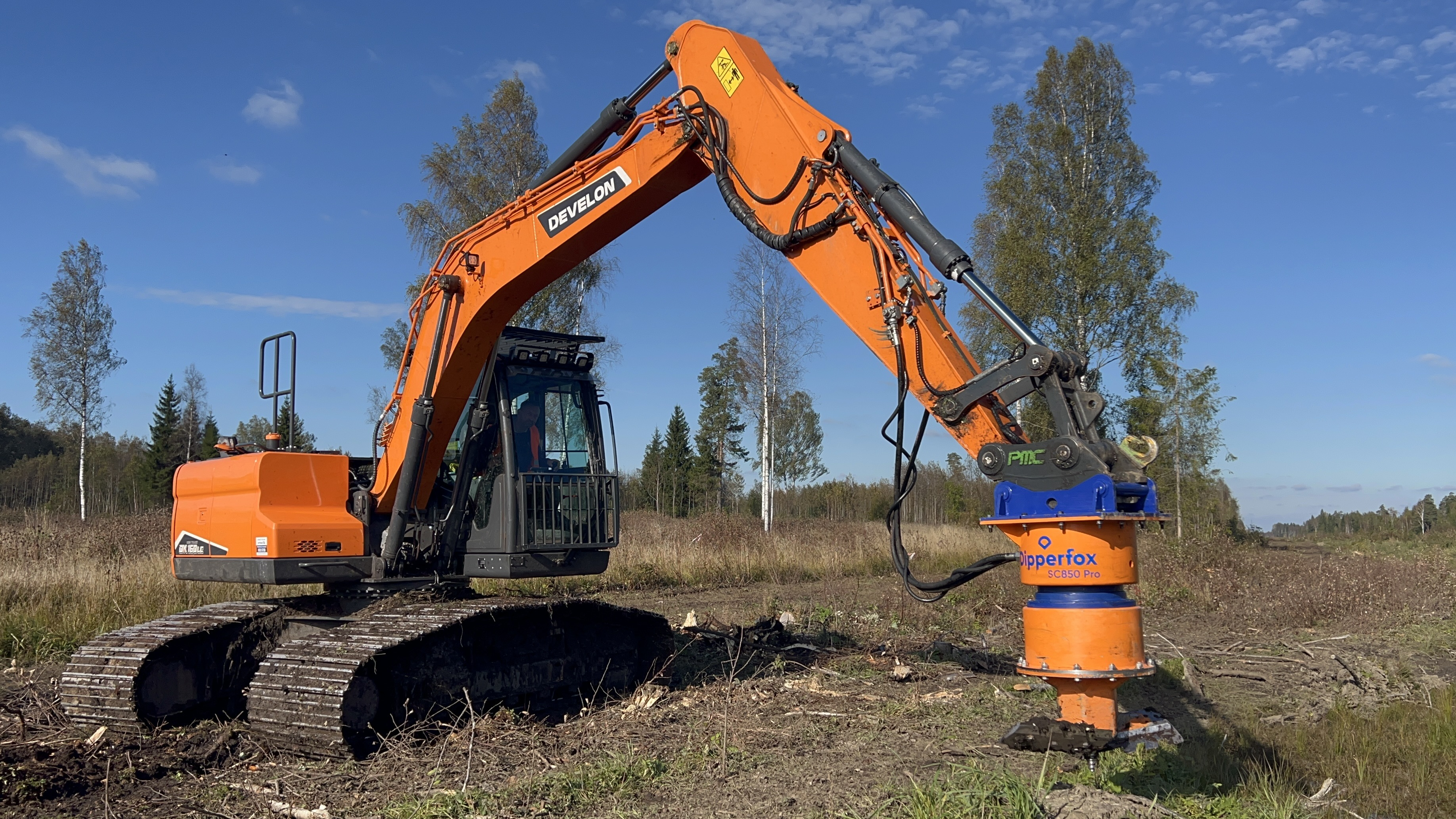
Vertical stump grinder (Click for video)

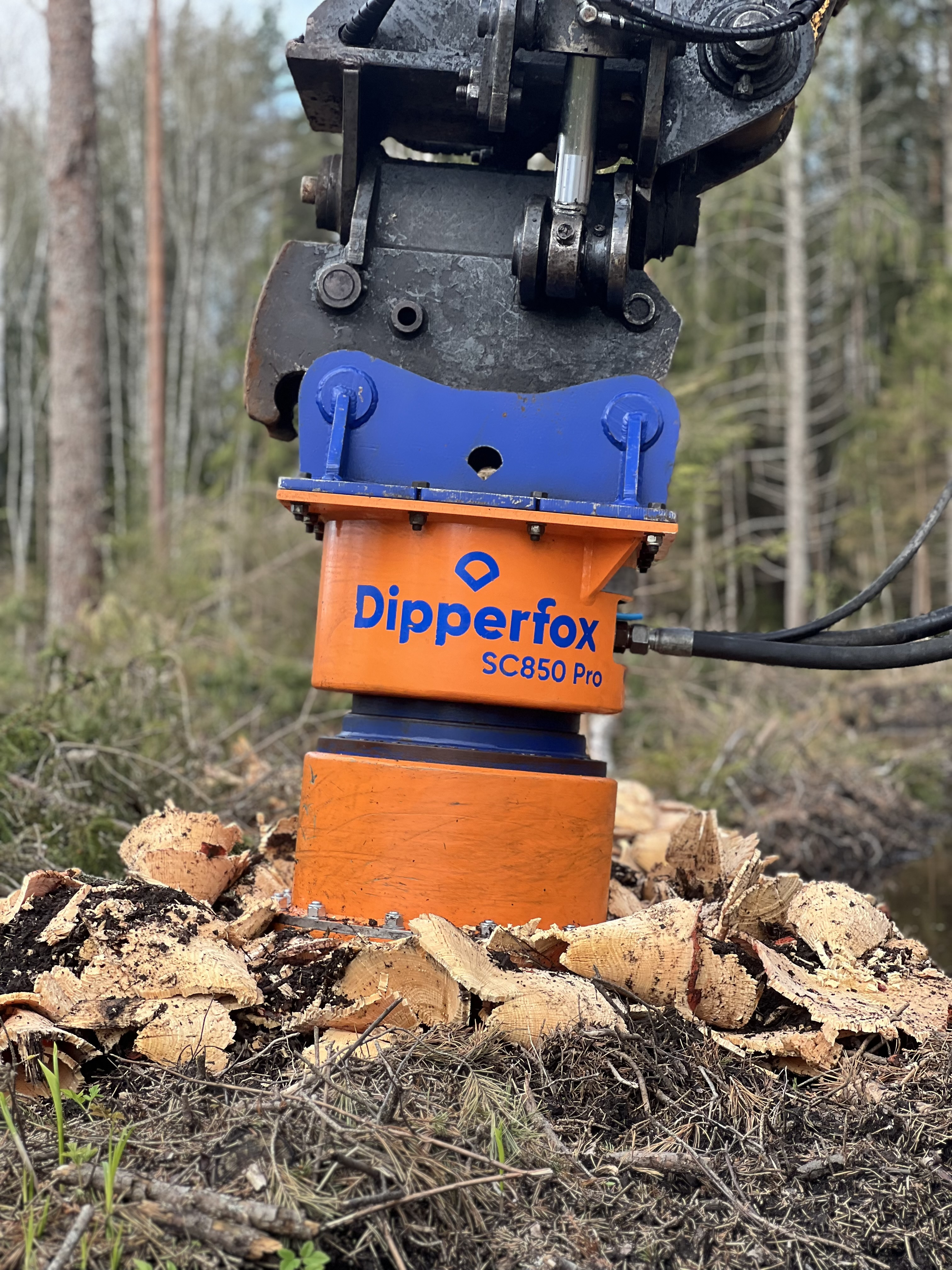
Vertical Stump Grinder Removing Stumps in the Forest. Dipperfox SC 850 Pro

A stump grinder is a machine designed to remove tree stumps by using a rotating cutting disc that chips away the wood. The machine typically features a cutter wheel with fixed carbide teeth. The cutter wheel's movements are controlled by hydraulic cylinders, which allow it to move laterally and vertically to grind through the stump.

Stump grinding is commonly performed by professional arborists or landscapers. However, stump grinders can also be rented from equipment hire companies for personal use. Given the machine’s power and potential hazards, proper operation is crucial to ensure both efficiency and safety.

Professionals hired to perform stump grinding often coordinate with utility companies to identify and mark underground utilities that may be affected during the grinding process. Depending on the size and number of stumps, the task can be completed relatively quickly by experienced operators.

== Vertical stump grinder ==
A stump grinder or stump cutter is a power tool or equipment attachment that removes tree stumps by means of a rotating cutting disc that chips away the wood.

One of the most common vertical stump grinders in the market is Dipperfox, which has also been showcased in widely popular Clarkson's Farm TV show.

Machines are available in various models and versions, to cover a power range from 70 to 300 Hp.

There are also types of stump grinders that are applied to tractors, excavators, skid steers and other earth moving and construction equipment. These machines can completely remove the roots of the trees or recover the central part of the roots.

Vertical stump grinders are usually used in forests, for plant biomass, for the forestry sector, and for the maintenance of green areas, etc. They can destroy an entire root of 50 cm (20 in) in diameter to more than one meter deep in 30 seconds. Studies have shown that the normal stump grinder (with disc and teeth) can eliminate most of the first 20–25 centimetres (8–10 in) of stumps. Vertical stump grinder can completely destroy tree stumps of up to 150 cm (59 in) in diameter permanently.

They are made up of a sturdy gear box from which a transmission shaft emerges to which the cutting edges are connected. Vertical grinders can remove the stump to a depth in the subsoil greater than one meter, while with normal horizontal grinders the stump is mostly shortened in the subsoil by 20 or 25 centimeters.
