= Józef Siemiradzki =

Polish geologist, naturalist and explorer (1858–1933)

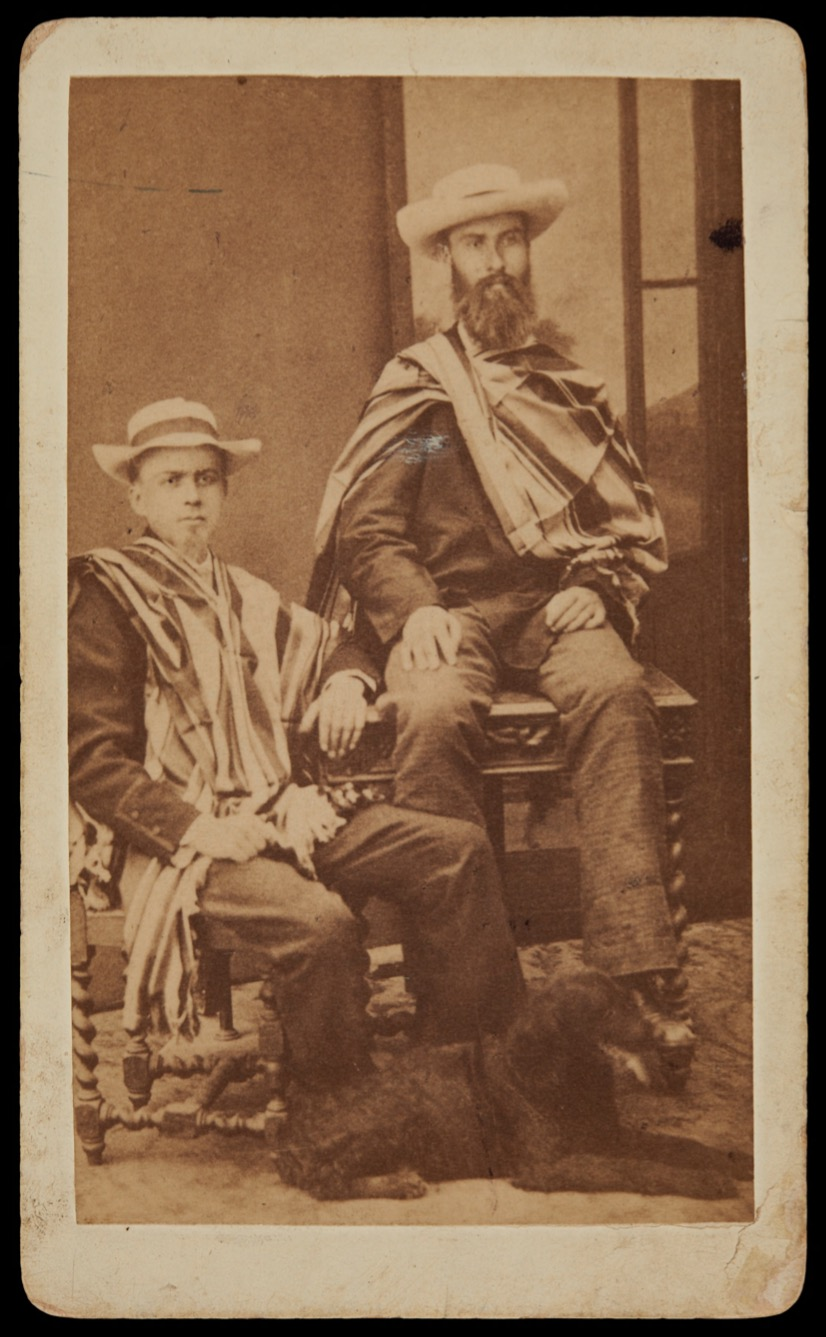
Józef Siemiradzki Jan Sztolcman (left) and dog in Ecuador in 1883

Józef Siemiradzki (March 28, 1858, Kharkov, Russian Empire – December 12, 1933, Warsaw, Poland) was a Polish geologist, naturalist, and explorer. He was professor of paleontology at the University of Lviv (1901–1933). Siemiradzki studied nature at the University of Tartu. He visited Latin America three times: 1882–1883, 1892, and 1895.
