= Liolaemus poconchilensis =

Conservation status
- Endangered (IUCN 3.1)

Scientific classification
- Kingdom: Animalia
- Phylum: Chordata
- Class: Reptilia
- Order: Squamata
- Suborder: Iguania
- Family: Liolaemidae
- Genus: Liolaemus
- Species: L. poconchilensis

Binomial name
- Liolaemus poconchilensis Valladares, 2004

Species of lizard

Liolaemus poconchilensis is a species of lizard in the family Liolaemidae. It is from Chile and Peru.
