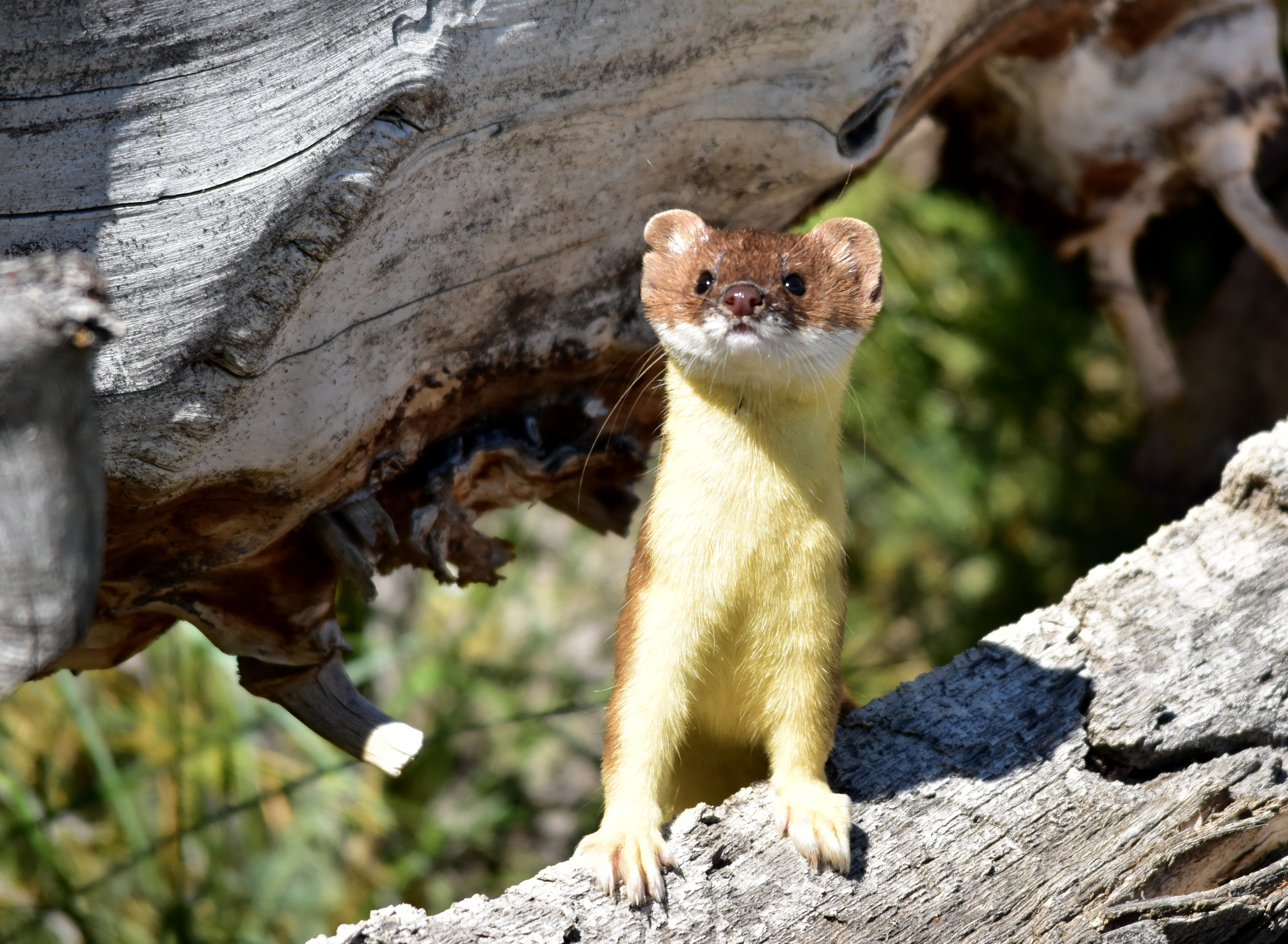
- Long-tailed weasel (N. frenata)
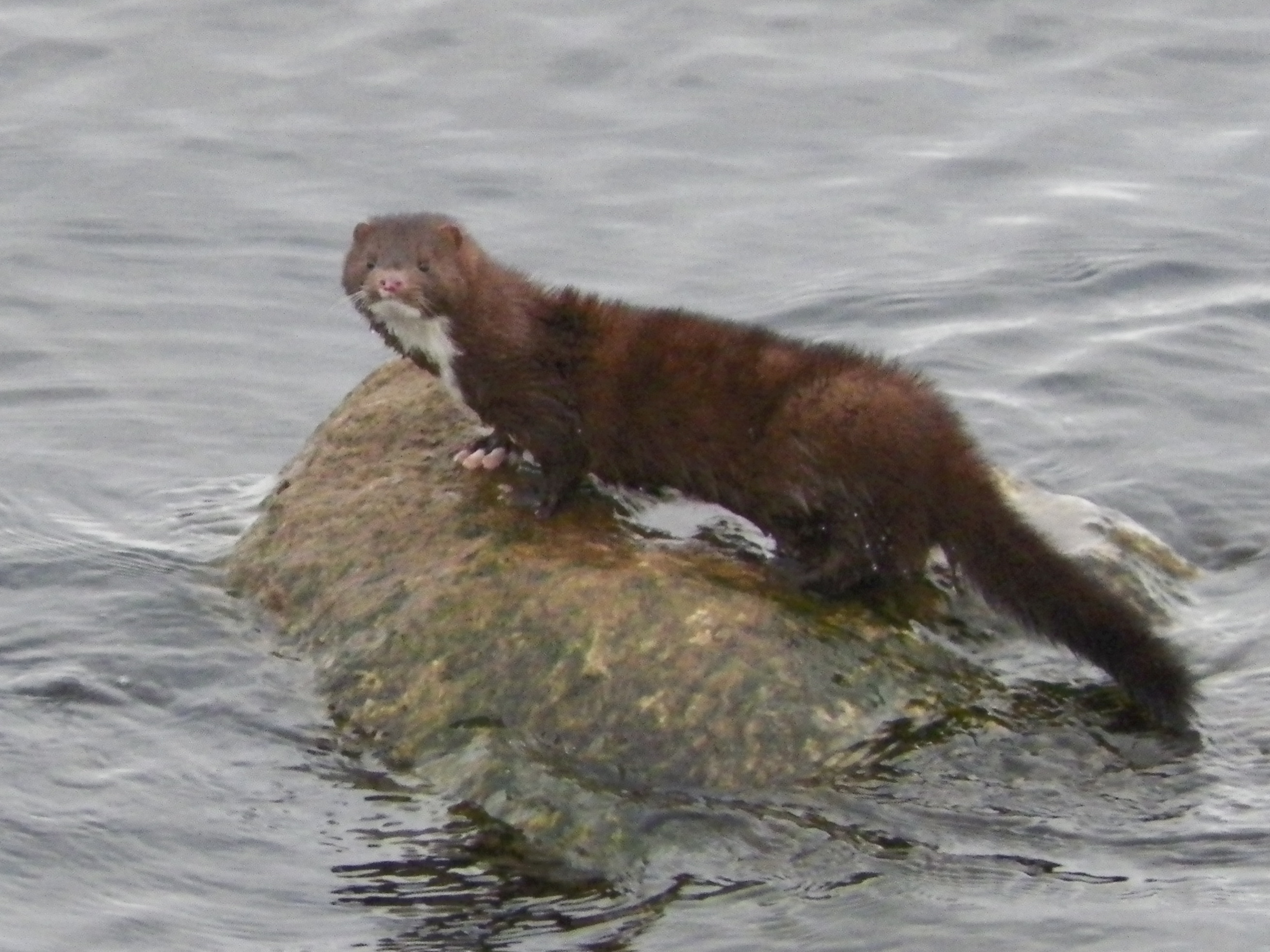
- American mink (N. vison)

Scientific classification
- Kingdom: Animalia
- Phylum: Chordata
- Class: Mammalia
- Order: Carnivora
- Family: Mustelidae
- Subfamily: Mustelinae
- Genus: Neogale; Gray, 1865

Type species
- Mustela frenata

Species
- N. africana N. felipei N. frenata N. vison †N. macrodon
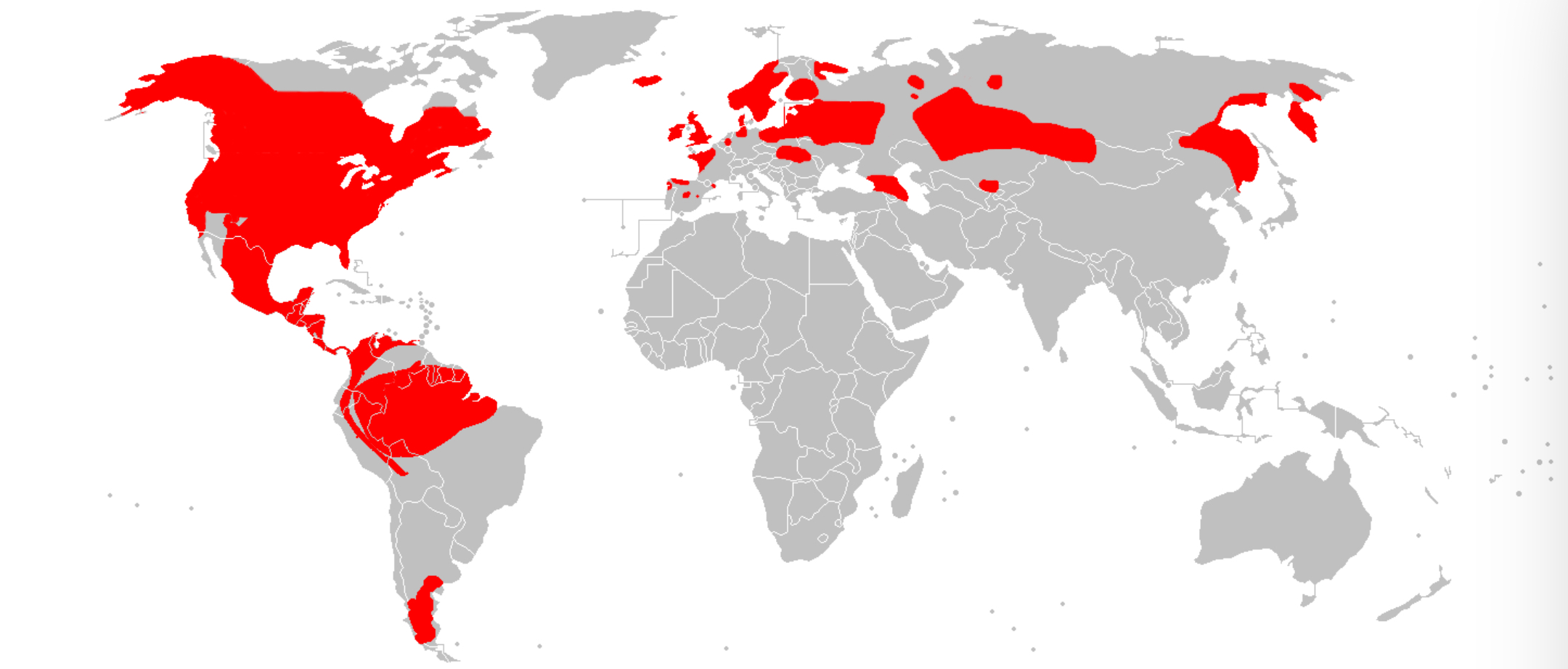
- Neogale range, including non-native areas

Synonyms
- Mustela (in part); Neovison Baryshnikov & Abramov, 1997; Grammogale; Cabreragale

= Neogale =

Genus of mustelids

Neogale (colloquially referred to as the New World weasels) is a genus of carnivorous, highly active small mammals belonging to the Mustelidae family (which also contains badgers, weasels, martens, otters, and wolverines, among others). Native to the Americas, members of the genus can be found as far north as Alaska and as far south as Argentina and Bolivia. Across this distribution, they thrive in a range of habitats, from the deep-freezes of the Alaskan and Canadian boreal forests to the arid desert southwest, and from the humid tropics of Central and South America (including the Amazon basin) to the windswept foothills of the Andes and northern Patagonia.

== Taxonomy ==
Members of this genus were formerly classified into the genera Mustela and Neovison, but many studies had previously recovered several American species of Mustela, as well as both species within Neovison, to comprise a clade (or monophyletic group) distinct from all other members of Mustelinae. A 2021 study found this clade to have diverged from Mustela during the Late Miocene, between 11.8 - 13.4 million years ago, with all members within the clade being more closely related to one another than to any of the other species in Mustela, and gave it the name Neogale, which was originally coined by John Edward Gray. The American Society of Mammalogists later accepted this change.

New World weasels

- Mustelinae
  - Mustela
  - Neogale
    - - - Neogale africana
        - Neogale felipei
      - Neogale frenata
    - - Neogale vison
      - †Neogale macrodon

Taxonomy of Neogale

== Species ==
There are 5 recent species in the genus, 4 extant and 1 extinct:

=== Extant species ===
Genus Neogale – Gray, 1865 – four species
Common name	Scientific name and subspecies	Range	Size and ecology	IUCN status and estimated population
Amazon weasel	Neogale africana (Desmarest, 1800) Two subspecies: N. a. africana; N. a. stolzmanni	Amazon Basin of South America	Size: Habitat: Diet:	LC
Colombian weasel	Neogale felipei (Izor and de la Torre, 1978)	Andes of Colombia and Ecuador	Size: Habitat: Diet:	VU
Long-tailed weasel	Neogale frenata (Lichtenstein, 1831)	Continental North America south of southern Canada; Andes and northern Amazon Basin in South America	Size: Habitat: Diet:	LC
American mink	Neogale vison (Schreber, 1777) Fifteen subspecies: N. v. aestuarina; N. v. aniakensis; N. v. energumenos; N. v. evagor; N. v. evergladensis; N. v. ingens; N. v. lacustris; N. v. letifera; N. v. lowii; N. v. lutensis; N. v. melampeplus; N. v. mink; N. v. nesolestes; N. v. vison; N. v. vulgivaga	North America (United States and Canada); introduced to Europe, Japan, Chile and Argentina	Size: Habitat: Diet:	LC

=== Extinct species ===
Image	Scientific name	Common name	Distribution
	Neogale macrodon (Prentiss, 1903)	Sea mink	Maritime Provinces in Canada, New England in the United States; now extinct
