= Colombian weasel =

Conservation status
- Vulnerable (IUCN 3.1)

Scientific classification
- Kingdom: Animalia
- Phylum: Chordata
- Class: Mammalia
- Order: Carnivora
- Family: Mustelidae
- Genus: Neogale
- Subgenus: Grammogale
- Species: N. felipei

Binomial name
- Neogale felipei (Izor and de la Torre, 1978)
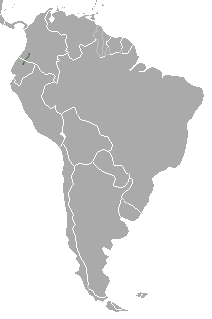
- Colombian weasel range

Synonyms
- Mustela felipei; Grammogale felipei; Cabreragale felipei

Species of carnivore

The Colombian weasel (Neogale felipei), also known as Don Felipe's weasel, is a very rare species of New World weasel only known with certainty from parts of Colombia and Ecuador. As of 2023, it has been recorded 11 times in the Colombian departments of Huila and Cauca, and once in nearby northern Ecuador. Both its scientific and alternative common name honour Philip "Don Felipe" Hershkovitz, an American mammalogist.

It appears to be largely restricted to riparian habitats at an altitude of 1,100 to 2,700 m (3,600 to 8,900 ft). There is extensive deforestation within its limited distribution within the northern Andes Mountains of Colombia and Ecuador, and with less than 12 known specimens, it is probably the rarest carnivoran in South America. It is considered vulnerable by the IUCN.

It is the second-smallest living carnivoran on average, being only slightly larger than the least weasel (Mustela nivalis) and slightly smaller than the stoat or ermine (M. erminea). The upperparts and tail are blackish-brown, while the underparts are orange-buff.

The species was formerly only known from specimens until the first photo of a living individual was taken in 2011 by an amateur naturalist who found one trapped in his parents' house; the weasel subsequently escaped to the outdoors. The image was uploaded to iNaturalist in 2018, where it gained widespread attention.

== Taxonomy ==
Originally described in the genus Mustela, a 2021 study reclassified into the genus Neogale along with two other former Mustela species, as well as the two species formerly classified in Neovison.

== Description ==
N. felipei has an elongated body with an average length of 22 cm (8.7 in), and a tail 11.5 cm (4.5 in) long. Weight ranges between 120 and 150 g (4.2 and 5.3 oz). N. felipei has a dark dorsal color with no variation, ventrally the weasel has a light orange color with gradual fading of color up to the head. Hair color from the tail to the nose is uniform with no striping or spotting. N. felipei has an inflated auditory bulla located near the dorsal midline on the body, along with a wide mesopterygoid fossa. The soles of the feet lack any fur, and extensive webbing is located on the second, third, and fourth digits, suggesting a semi-aquatic lifestyle.

== Distribution and habitat ==
N. felipei is one of the least studied carnivore species in the Americas. Photos taken of a Colombian weasel by Juan de Roux are the first known photos of a living Colombian weasel. These tiny carnivores are thought to maintain a larger geographical range that currently known. Reports of sightings have placed N. felipei in the mountain ranges of western Colombia to northern Ecuador. N. felipei was originally thought to be endemic to Colombia however recent specimens have been collected in Ecuador that have since proven this thought wrong. Distribution and habitat modeling surveys have been able to predict that N. felipei is distributed between 20 protected areas in Colombia, and 14 in Ecuador along with three previously known locations in both countries, the majority of these locations lie in protected areas of the forest.

From geographic modeling, and collected specimens it has been concluded that Neogale felipei lives in largely riparian habitats, primarily staying close to rivers, streams, and along the shorelines of other natural water sources. Since this habitat lies in an elevation range of 1,100 to 2,700 m (3,600 to 8,900 ft) it is classified as being in a "cloud forest" consisting of 100% humidity adding to the riparian habitat.

== Diet ==
N. felipei is a carnivorous mammal that preys primarily on fish, other small aquatic animals, and small terrestrial mammals. Hunting is aided by the use of webbed feet and camouflaged fur.

== Conservation status ==
Neogale felipei has been recognized by the IUCN as being vulnerable and having a decreasing population. However, due to rarity of sightings and deforestation of known habitat, the true size of the population remains unclear.
