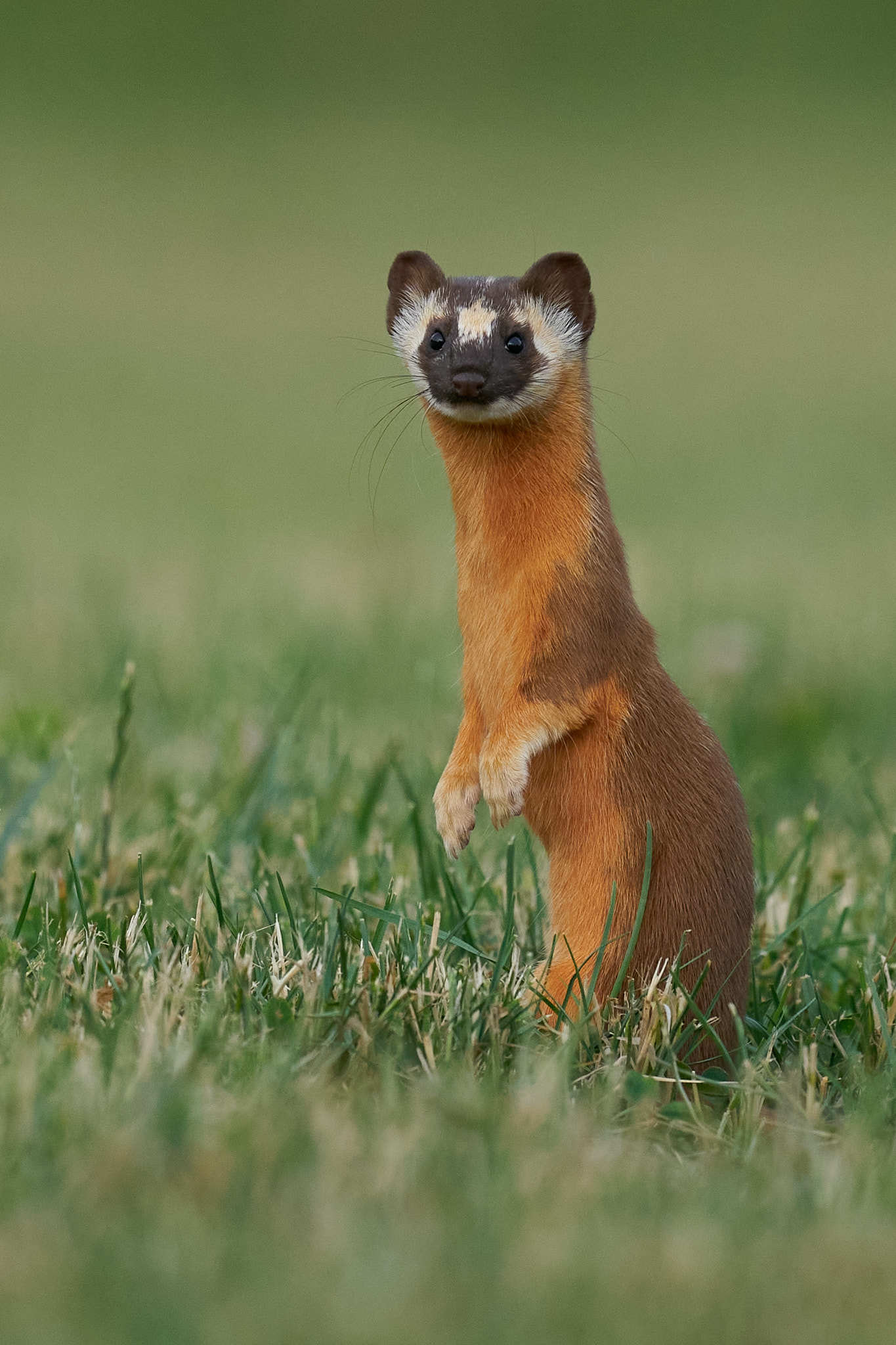
- In California

Conservation status
- Least Concern (IUCN 3.1)

Scientific classification
- Kingdom: Animalia
- Phylum: Chordata
- Class: Mammalia
- Order: Carnivora
- Family: Mustelidae
- Genus: Neogale
- Species: N. frenata

Binomial name
- Neogale frenata (Lichtenstein, 1831)
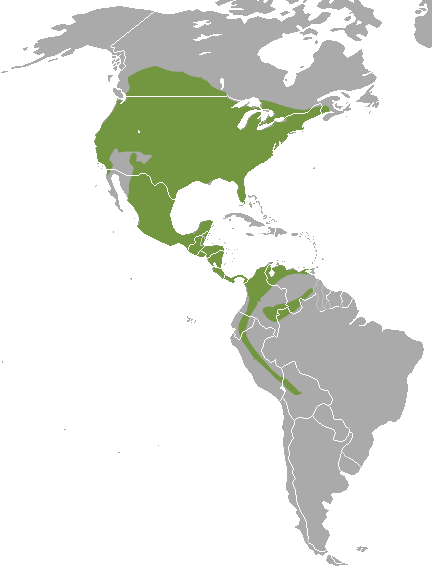
- Long-tailed weasel range

Synonyms
- Mustela frenata

= Long-tailed weasel =

Species of weasel native to the Americas

The long-tailed weasel (Neogale frenata), also known as the bridled weasel, masked ermine, or big stoat, is a species of weasel found in North, Central, and South America. It is distinct from the short-tailed weasel (Mustela erminea), also known as a "stoat", a close relation in the genus Mustela that originated in Eurasia and crossed into North America some half million years ago; the two species are visually similar, having long, slender bodies and tails with short legs and a black tail tip.

Long-tailed weasels exhibit scale-dependent patterns of habitat selection, favoring forest patches, fencerows, and drainage ditches while avoiding agricultural fields. They typically make their habitats in forests and underground in burrows of other small mammals.

== Taxonomy ==
The long-tailed weasel was originally described in the genus Mustela with the name Mustela frenata by Hinrich Lichtenstein in 1831. In 1993, the classification, Mustela frenata, was accepted into the second edition of the Mammal species of the world: a taxonomic and geographic reference, which was published by the Smithsonian Institution Press. The species, with classification and name Mustela frenata, was accepted into the Global Biodiversity Information Facility. Later, in a study published in 2021 in the Journal of Animal Diversity, Bruce Patterson et al. reclassified the long-tailed weasel into the genus Neogale along with two other former Mustela species, as well as the two species formerly classified in Neovison.

== Evolution ==
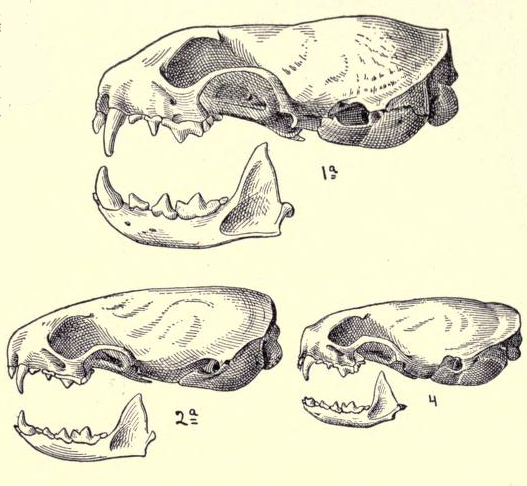
Skulls of a long-tailed weasel (top), a stoat (bottom left) and least weasel (bottom right), as illustrated in Merriam's Synopsis of the Weasels of North America

The long-tailed weasel is the product of a process begun 5–7 million years ago, when northern forests were replaced by open grassland, thus prompting an explosive evolution of small, burrowing rodents. The long-tailed weasel's ancestors were larger than the current form, and underwent a reduction in size to exploit the new food source. The long-tailed weasel arose in North America 2 million years ago, shortly before the stoat evolved as its mirror image in Eurasia. The species thrived during the Ice Age, as its small size and long body allowed it to easily operate beneath snow, as well as hunt in burrows. The evolution of an elongated body shape maximizes the efficiency with which Mustela frenata can trap prey underground, as the majority of it lives in burrows and in tunnels. The long-tailed weasel and the stoat remained separated until half a million years ago, when falling sea levels exposed the Bering land bridge, thus allowing the stoat to cross into North America. However, unlike the latter species, the long-tailed weasel never crossed the land bridge, and did not spread into Eurasia.

== Description ==
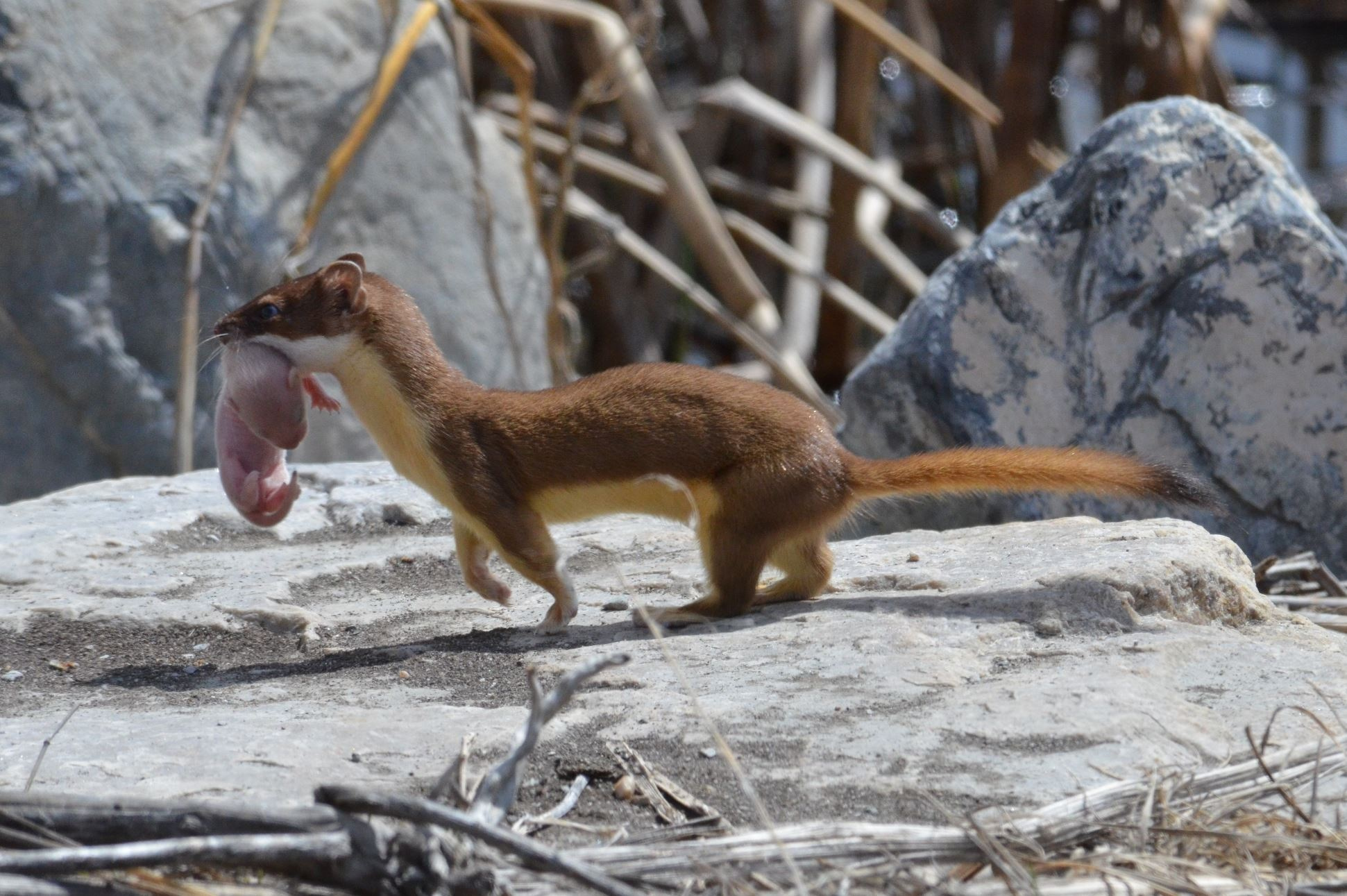
Carrying kit, in Utah

The long-tailed weasel is one of the larger weasels (comprising both Neogale and Mustela) in North America. There is substantial disagreement both on the upper end of their size and difference in size by sex by source: one indicates a body length of 300–350 mm (12–14 in) and a tail comprising 40–70% of the head and body length. It adds that in most populations, females are 10–15% smaller than males, thus making them about the same size as large male stoats, according to a second source. A third states they range from 11 to 22 inches (280–560 mm) in length, with the tail measuring an additional 3 to 6 inches (80–150 mm). It maintains the long-tailed weasel weighs between 3 and 9 ounces (85-267 g) with males being about twice as large as the females.

The eyes are black in daylight, but glow bright emerald green when caught in a spotlight at night. The dorsal fur is brown in summer, while the underparts are whitish and tinged with yellowish or buffy brown from the chin to the inguinal region. The tail has a distinct black tip. Long-tailed weasels in Florida and the southwestern US may have facial markings of a white or yellowish colour. In northern areas in winter, the long-tailed weasel's fur becomes white, sometimes with yellow tints, but the tail retains its black tip. The long-tailed weasel moults twice annually, once in autumn (October to mid-November) and once in spring (March–April). Each moult takes about 3–4 weeks and is governed by day length and mediated by the pituitary gland. Unlike the stoat, whose soles are thickly furred all year, the long-tailed weasel's soles are naked in summer.

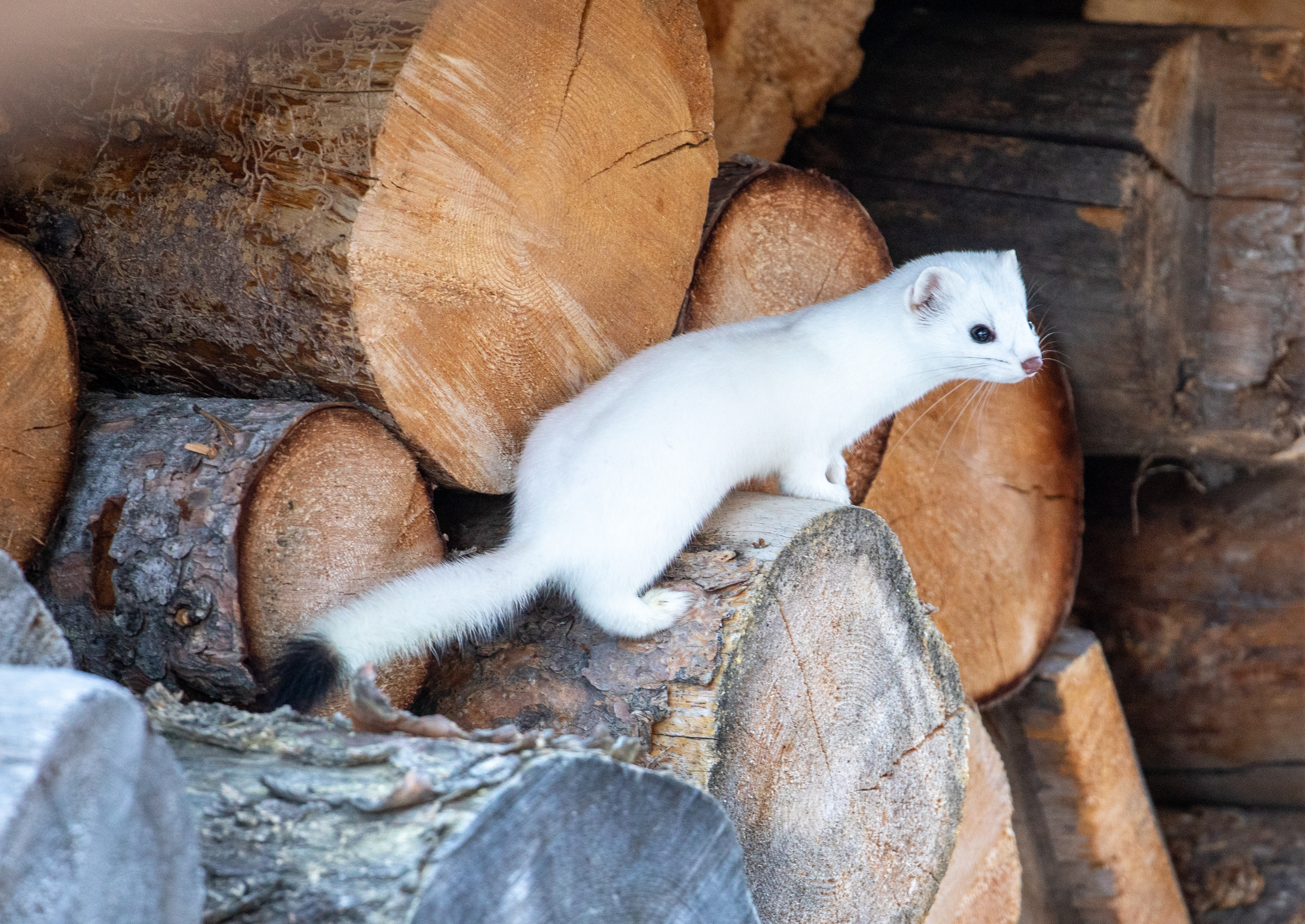
White coat

The long-tailed weasel has well-developed anal scent glands, which produce a strong and musky odour. Analysis of a dichloromethane extract of the anal gland secretion showed it contained 2,2-dimethylthietane, 2,4-dimethylthietane, 2,3-dimethylthietane, 2-propylthietane, 3,3-dimethyl-1,2-dithiolane, 3-ethyl-1,2-dithiolane, indole and 2-aminoacetophenone. Unlike skunks, which spray their musk, the long-tailed weasel drags and rubs its body over surfaces in order to leave the scent, to mark their territory and, when startled or threatened, to discourage predators.

== Habitat ==
=== Habitat type ===
Long-tailed weasels are found in a variety of habitats, but have been found to make use of both coniferous and deciduous forests in a mix of mid-successional and early-successional stages. They prefer open forests, wooded areas, or shrub lands as they offer optimal cover for habitation and hunting. Long-tailed weasel habitats range in altitude from sea level to alpine meadow. Typically, long-tailed weasels are not present in dry brush, shrub, and scrub habitats such as deserts. It is assumed that long-tailed weasels are susceptible to habitat fragmentation, as they avoid habitation of areas used for farming.

=== Habitat size and distribution ===
The home range of the long-tailed weasel is estimated to range between 10-20 ha (25-50 ac) with densities of 1 weasel/km² (2.6/mi²), with the maximum number of weasels being 7 weasel/km² (18/mi²). Long-tailed weasels are solitary in nature and prefer distance between themselves and members of their own species.

=== Geographical Distribution ===
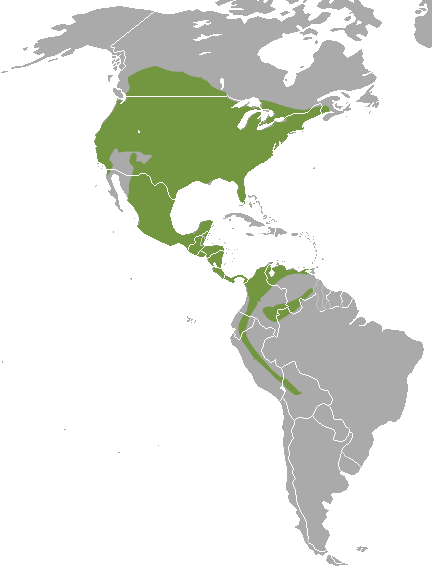
Geographical range of the Long Tailed Weasel

The geographical distribution of long-tailed weasels ranges from southern Canada to central Bolivia. They are found throughout the United States, Canada, Mexico, and Central Americas, with their distribution extending into parts of South America. More specifically, their range includes Belize, Bolivia, Colombia, Costa Rica, Ecuador, El Salvador, Guatemala, Honduras, Nicaragua, Panama, Peru, and Venezuela. In the United States, they are found in most states, excluding the southwestern desert regions. In South America, long-tailed weasels are found in Venezuela as well as along the Andes Mountains range, and extending as far south as Bolivia. Within this broader range, long-tailed weasels have been recorded in elevations as high as 1893 meters. This is one of the highest recorded elevations for a long-tailed weasel in the eastern United States, particularly in the area surrounding the Great Smoky Mountains National Park.

== Identification ==
=== Tracks and scat ===
The footprint of a long-tailed weasel is about 1 inch (25 mm) long. Although they have five toes, only four of them can be seen in their tracks. The only exception to this is when walking in the snow or mud, all five of their toes are shown. Their footprints will also appear heavier if the weasel is carrying food. Another way to determine the presence of a weasel is by looking for wavy indents made by their tails in the snow.

The long-tailed weasel uses one spot to leave their feces. This spot is usually near where they burrow. They'll continuously use this spot for their droppings until it gets covered by environmental changes.

=== Distinguishing features ===
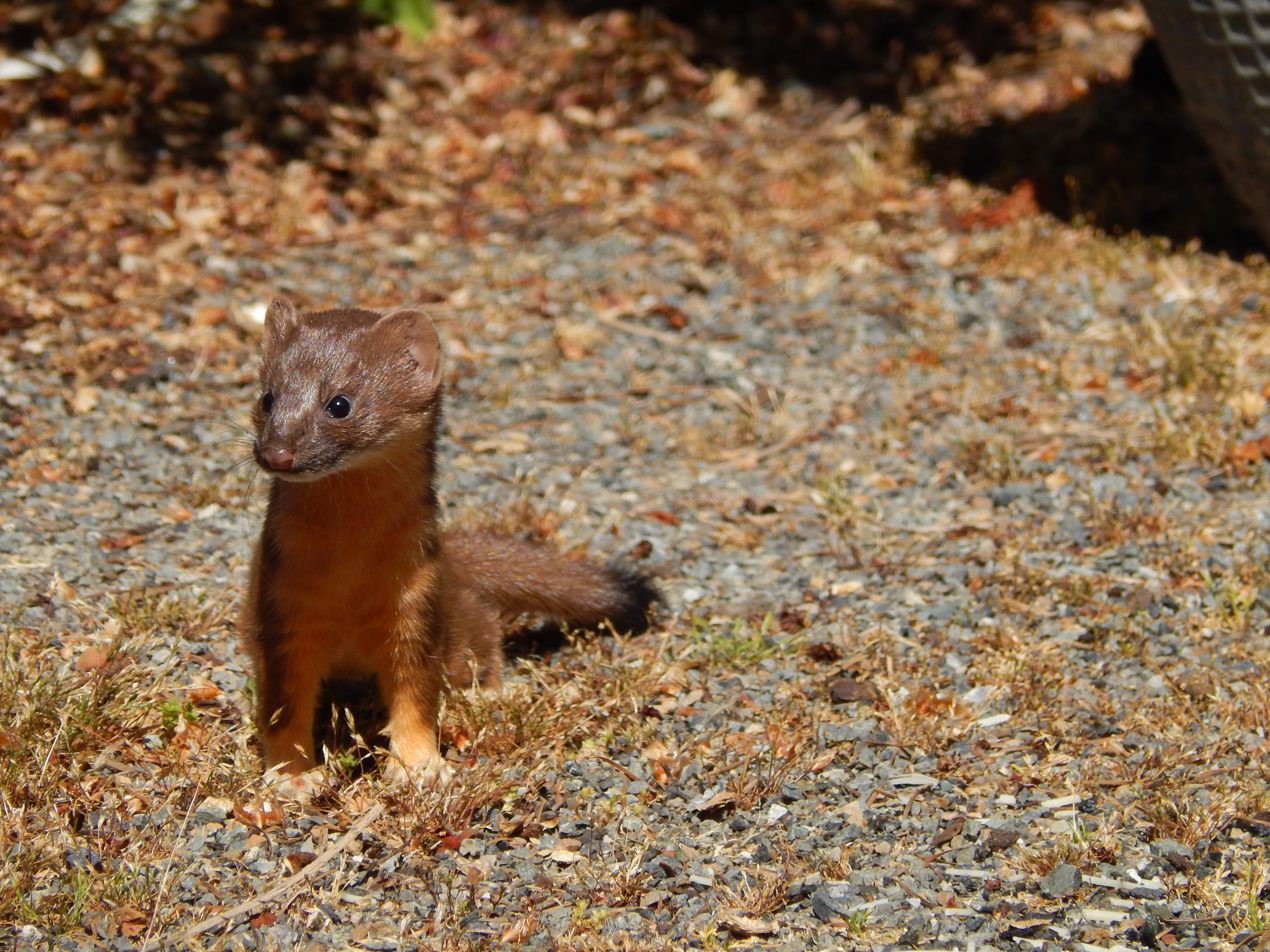
Black-tipped tail, brown and yellowish fur, and long whiskers distinguish this Long-tailed weasel in Seattle, Washington.

A black-tipped tail, yellowish-white belly fur, and brown fur on its back and sides are distinguishing for the long-tailed weasel. Additionally, the long-tailed weasel has long whiskers, a long narrow body, short legs, and a long tail that is approximately half the length of the body and head of the weasel. The long-tailed weasel has a triangular-shaped head, which is accentuated by small, round ears towards the back of the head. Males can be up to double the weight of females due to the size of the skull. Female long-tailed weasels have narrower skulls, which allows for more efficient hunting within the burrows of their rodent prey. Compared to the short-tailed weasel the long-tailed weasel lacks a white line on the insides of its legs.

== Behaviour ==
=== Reproduction and development ===
The long-tailed weasel mates in July–August, with implantation of the fertilised egg on the uterine wall being delayed until about March. The gestation period lasts 10 months, with actual embryonic development taking place only during the last four weeks of this period, an adaptation to timing births for spring, when small mammals are abundant. Litter size generally consists of 5–8 kits, which are born in April–May. The kits are born partially naked, blind and weighing 3 grams (0.11 oz), about the same weight of a hummingbird. The long-tailed weasel's growth rate is rapid, as by the age of three weeks, the kits are well furred, can crawl outside the nest and eat meat. At this time, the kits weigh 21–27 grams (0.74–0.95 oz). At five weeks of age, the kits' eyes open, and the young become physically active and vocal. Weaning begins at this stage, with the kits emerging from the nest and accompanying the mother in hunting trips a week later. The kits are fully grown by autumn, at which time the family disbands. The females are able to breed at 3–4 months of age, while males become sexually mature at 15–18 months.

=== Denning and sheltering behaviour ===
The long-tailed weasel dens in ground burrows, under stumps or beneath rock piles. It usually does not dig its own burrows, but commonly uses abandoned chipmunk, ground squirrel, gopher, mole, and mountain beaver holes. The 22–30 cm (8.7–11.8 in) diameter nest chamber is situated around 60 cm (24 in) from the burrow entrance, and is lined with straw and the fur of prey.

=== Defense ===
The predators of the long-tailed weasel include red foxes, grey foxes, coyotes, grey wolf, bobcats, Canadian lynx, barred owls, great horned owls, rough-legged hawks, American goshawks, and snakes, such as cottonmouths and rattlesnakes. The weasel will give off its musky odor, however, this is not primarily used when encountering other creatures. When leaving an area they were just in, they will leave their odor behind. This is done by the weasels taking themselves and hauling their bodies across surfaces they just interacted with. The long-tailed weasel does this to "discourage predators" from coming back to the area, possibly indicating that the weasel considers this a safe haven for return. This type of reaction is also reserved for when the weasel feels it is in danger, or when it is looking for a mate. Tree-climbing is another type of defense mechanism that long-tailed weasels utilize against predators on the ground. These weasels will climb up a reasonable height of a tree when they sense that they are in danger. They will then sit silent and "motionless", while looking at their presumed predator. These weasels keep their guard up like this until the predator leaves, and when the weasel considers itself no longer in danger.

Another common defense of long-tailed weasels is its black-tipped tail, which differs in color from the rest of the body. When the long-tailed weasel becomes more white in the winter, this defense mechanism is especially used. The black-tipped tail distracts predators from the rest of the body, as it is more visible to the eye of a predator. This causes the visibility of the actual weasel to be rather difficult and makes the predator attack the tail instead of the weasel. The weasel is allowed to escape the predator because of this.

=== Diet ===
Long-tailed weasel with rodent prey in Box Elder County, Utah

The long-tailed weasel is a fearless and aggressive hunter which may attack animals far larger than itself. When stalking, it waves its head from side to side in order to pick up the scent of its prey. It hunts small prey, such as mice, by rushing at them and killing them with one bite to the head. With large prey, such as rabbits, the long-tailed weasel strikes quickly, taking its prey off guard. It grabs the nearest part of the animal and climbs upon its body, maintaining its hold with its feet. The long-tailed weasel then manoeuvres itself to inflict a lethal bite to the neck.

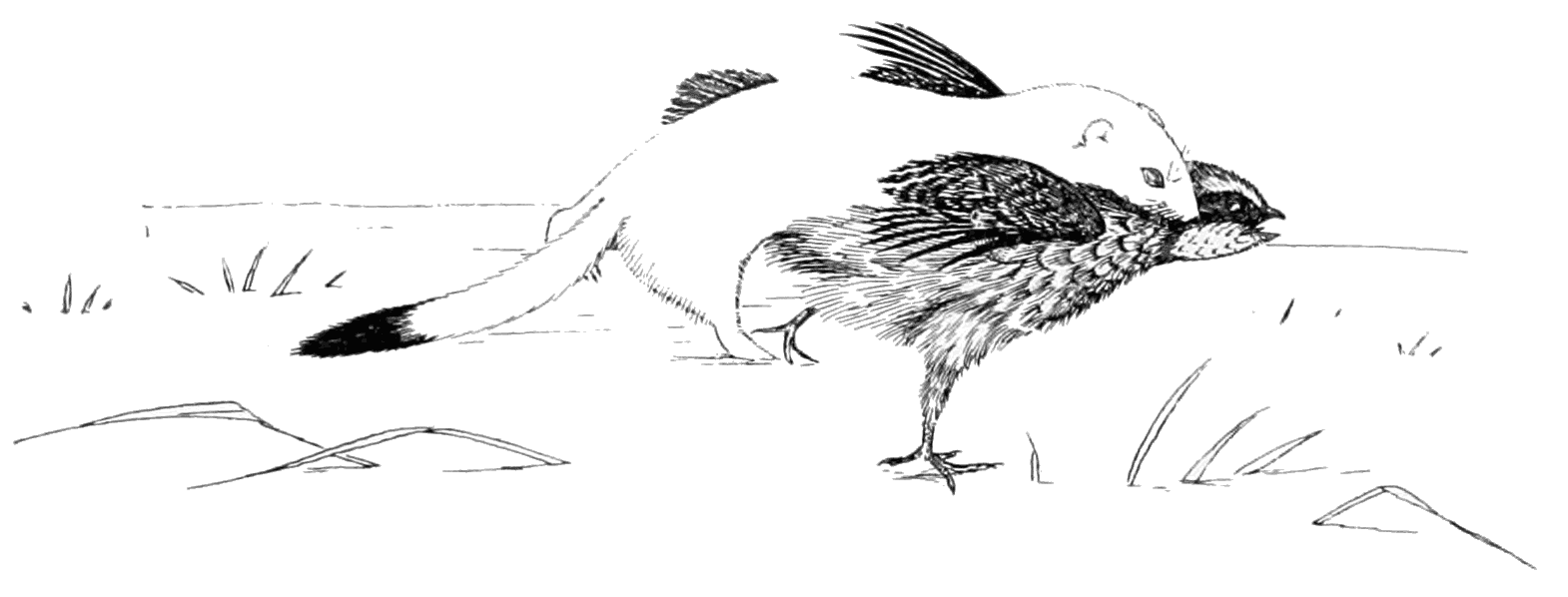
Long-tailed weasel in winter fur attacking a quail, as illustrated in Popular Science Monthly

The long-tailed weasel is an obligate carnivore which prefers its prey to be fresh or alive, eating only the carrion stored within its burrows. Rodents are almost exclusively taken when they are available. Its primary prey consists of mice, rats, squirrels, chipmunks, shrews, moles and rabbits. Occasionally, it may eat small birds, bird eggs, reptiles, amphibians, fish, earthworms and some insects. The species has also been observed to take bats from nursery colonies. It occasionally surplus kills, usually in spring when the kits are being fed, and again in autumn. Some of the surplus kills may be cached, but are usually left uneaten. Kits in captivity eat from a quarter to half of their body weight in 24 hours, while adults eat only one fifth to one third. After killing its prey, the long-tailed weasel laps up the blood, but does not suck it, as is popularly believed. With small prey, also the fur, feathers, flesh and bones are consumed, but only some flesh is eaten from large prey. When stealing eggs, the long-tailed weasel removes each egg from its nest one at a time, then carries it in its mouth to a safe location where it bites off the top and licks out the contents or if they have babies in the den they may hold it in their mouth all the way back to them.

== Subspecies ==
As of 2005, 42 subspecies are recognised.

Subspecies	Trinomial authority	Description	Range	Synonyms
Bridled weasel N. f. frenata (Nominate subspecies)	Lichtenstein, 1831	A large subspecies with a long tail, relatively short black tip and has a black head with conspicuous white markings	Mexico	aequatorialis (Coues, 1877) brasiliensis (Sevastianoff, 1813) mexicanus (Coues, 1877)
N. f. affinis	Gray, 1874	A large, very dark subspecies with very little white marking on the face		costaricensis (J. A. Allen, 1916) macrurus (J. A. Allen, 1912) meridana (Hollister, 1914)
N. f. agilis	Tschudi, 1844			macrura (J. A. Allen 1916)
Black Hills long-tailed weasel N. f. alleni	Merriam, 1896	Similar to arizonensis in size and general characters, but with yellower upper parts	The Black Hills, South Dakota	
N. f. altifrontalis	Hall, 1936			saturata (Miller, 1912)
Arizona long-tailed weasel N. f. arizonensis	Mearns, 1891	Similar to longicauda, but smaller in size	The Sierra Nevada and Rocky Mountain systems, reaching British Columbia in the Rocky Mountain region	
N. f. arthuri	Hall, 1927			
N. f. aureoventris	Gray, 1864			affinis (Lönnberg, 1913) jelskii (Taczanowski, 1881) macrura (Taczanowski, 1874)
Bolivian long-tailed weasel N. f. boliviensis	Hall, 1938			
N. f. celenda	Hall, 1944			
Costa Rican long-tailed weasel N. f. costaricensis	Goldman, 1912			brasiliensis (Gray, 1874)
N. f. effera	Hall, 1936			
Chiapas long-tailed weasel N. f. goldmani	Merriam, 1896	Similar to frenata in size and general characters, but with a longer tail and hind feet, darker fur and more restricted white markings	The mountains of southeastern Chiapas	
N. f. gracilis	Brown, 1908			
N. f. helleri	Hall, 1935			
Inyo long-tailed weasel N. f. inyoensis	Hall, 1936			
N. f. latirostra	Hall, 1896			arizonensis (Grinnell and Swarth, 1913)
N. f. leucoparia	Merriam, 1896	Similar to frenata, but slightly larger and with more extensive white markings		
Common long-tailed weasel N. f. longicauda	Bonaparte, 1838	A large subspecies with a very long tail with a short black tip. The upper parts are pale yellowish brown or pale raw amber brown, while the underparts vary in colour from strong buffy yellow to ochraceous orange.	The Great Plains from Kansas northward	
N. f. macrophonius	Elliot, 1905			
Redwood weasel N. f. munda	Bangs, 1899			
New Mexico long-tailed weasel N. f. neomexicanus	Barber and Cockerell, 1898			
Nevada long-tailed weasel N. f. nevadensis	Hall, 1936			longicauda (Coues, 1891)
Nicaraguan long-tailed weasel N. f. nicaraguae	J. A. Allen, 1916			
N. f. nigriauris	Hall, 1936			xanthogenys (Gray, 1874)
N. f. notius	Bangs, 1899			
New York long-tailed weasel N. f. noveboracensis	Emmons, 1840	A large subspecies, with a shorter tail than longicauda. The upper parts are rich, dark chocolate brown, while the underparts and upper lip are white and washed with yellowish colouring.	The eastern United States from southern Maine to North Carolina and west to Illinois	fusca (DeKay, 1842) richardsonii (Baird, 1858)
N. f. occisor	Bangs, 1899			
N. f. olivacea	Howell, 1913			
Oregon long-tailed weasel N. f. oregonensis	Merriam, 1896	Similar to xanthogenys, but larger, darker in colour and with more restricted facial markings	The Rogue River Valley, Oregon	
N. f. oribasus	Bangs, 1899			
Panama long-tailed weasel N. f. panamensis	Hall, 1932			
Florida long-tailed weasel N. f. peninsulae	Rhoads, 1894	Equal in size to noveboracensis, but with a skull more similar to that of longicauda. The upper parts are dull chocolate brown, while the underparts are yellowish.	Peninsular Florida	
N. f. perda	Merriam, 1902			
N. f. perotae	Hall, 1936			
N. f. primulina	Jackson, 1913			
N. f. pulchra	Hall, 1936			
Cascade Mountains long-tailed weasel N. f. saturata	Merriam, 1896	Similar to arizonensis, but larger and darker, with an ochraceous belly and distinct spots behind the corners of the mouth	The Cascade Range	
N. f. spadix	Bangs, 1896	Similar to longicauda, but much darker		
Texas long-tailed weasel N. f. texensis	Hall, 1936			
Tropical long-tailed weasel N. f. tropicalis	Merriam, 1896	Similar to frenata, but much smaller and darker, with less extensive white facial markings and an orange underbelly	The tropical coast belt of southern Mexico and Guatemala from Veracruz southward	frenatus (Coues, 1877) noveboracensis (DeKay, 1840) perdus (Merriam, 1902) richardsoni (Bonaparte, 1838)
Washington long-tailed weasel N. f. washingtoni	Merriam, 1896	Similar to noveboracensis in size, but with a longer tail with a shorter black tip	Washington	
California long-tailed weasel N. f. xanthogenys	Gray, 1843	A medium-sized subspecies with a long tail, a face with whitish markings and ochraceous underparts	The Sonoran and transition faunas of California, on both sides of the Sierra Nevada Mountains	

== Cultural meanings ==
In North America, Native Americans (in the region of Chatham County, North Carolina) deemed the long-tailed weasel to be a bad sign; crossing its path meant a "speedy death".
