= Tree stump =

Remains of a tree trunk

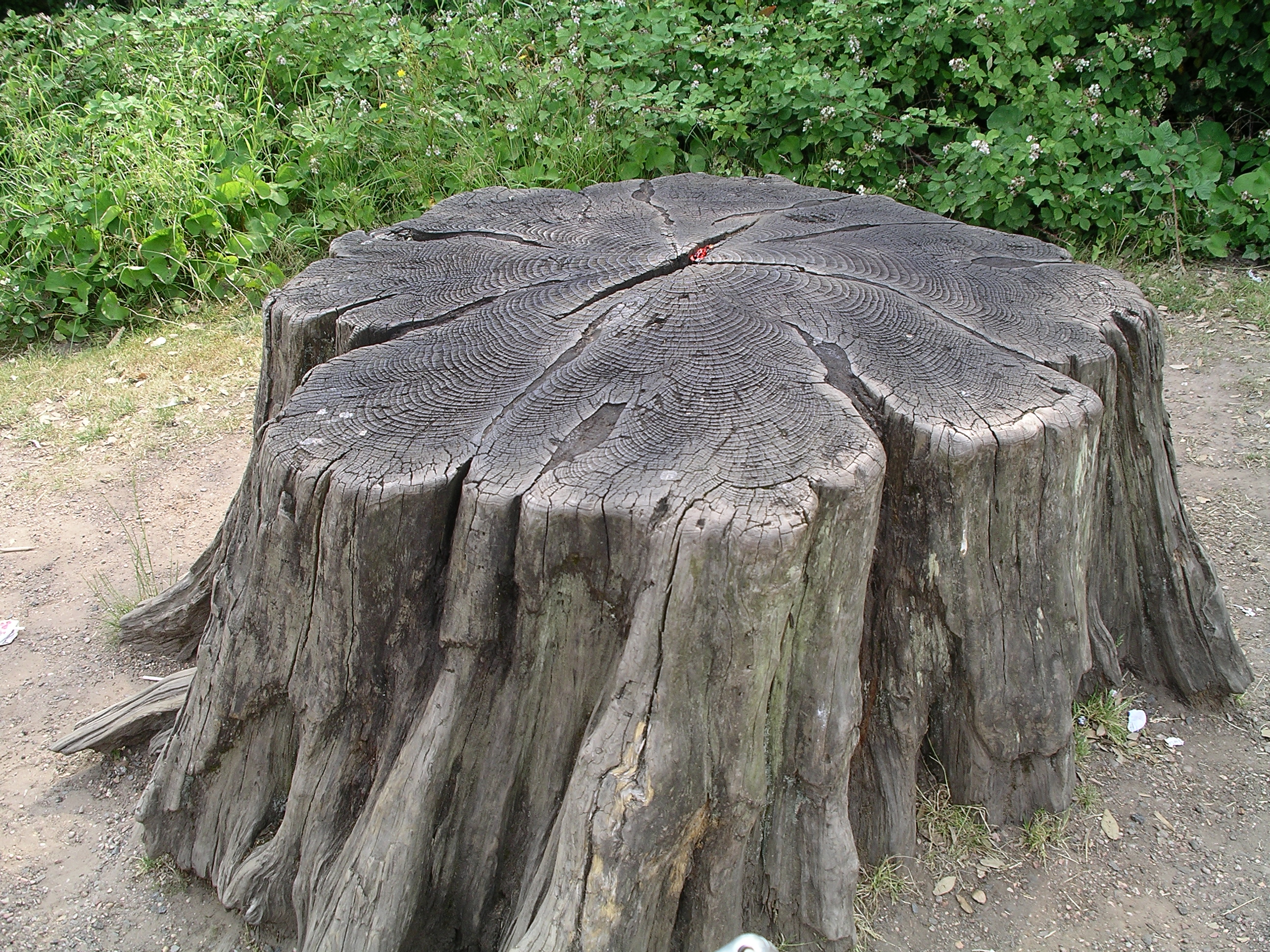
Tree stump, about 37 years after falling

A tree stump is the remaining portion of a tree trunk and its roots that remains after a tree has been felled or has naturally fallen. The roots often remain largely intact underground.

The cross section of a tree stump shows the annual growth rings that can reveal the tree's age, growth patterns, and environmental conditions during its lifetime. The scientific study of these rings, known as dendrochronology, can reveal historical climate information.

Many tree species, particularly deciduous trees, retain the ability to regenerate new growth from stumps. This natural regeneration capacity has been utilized in traditional forest management for centuries. It is known as coppicing, and multiple shoots can grow from the remaining trunk.

Tree stumps can present practical challenges in land management, agriculture, and urban planning, as they can be difficult and expensive to remove. Stumps can be removed by various methods including mechanical grinding, digging, burning, and chemical decomposition.

== Regeneration ==
Stumps (both those on the ground and stumps of removed branches) are sometimes able to regenerate depending on the species. Often, a deciduous tree that has been cut will re-sprout in multiple places around the edge of the stump or from the roots. Depending on whether the tree is being removed or whether the forest is expected to recover, this can be either desirable or undesirable. Stump sprouts can grow very quickly and so become viable trees themselves either for aesthetics or timber, due to the existing root structure; however, the cut portion of the trunk may weaken the sprouts and introduce disease into the newly forming tree(s).

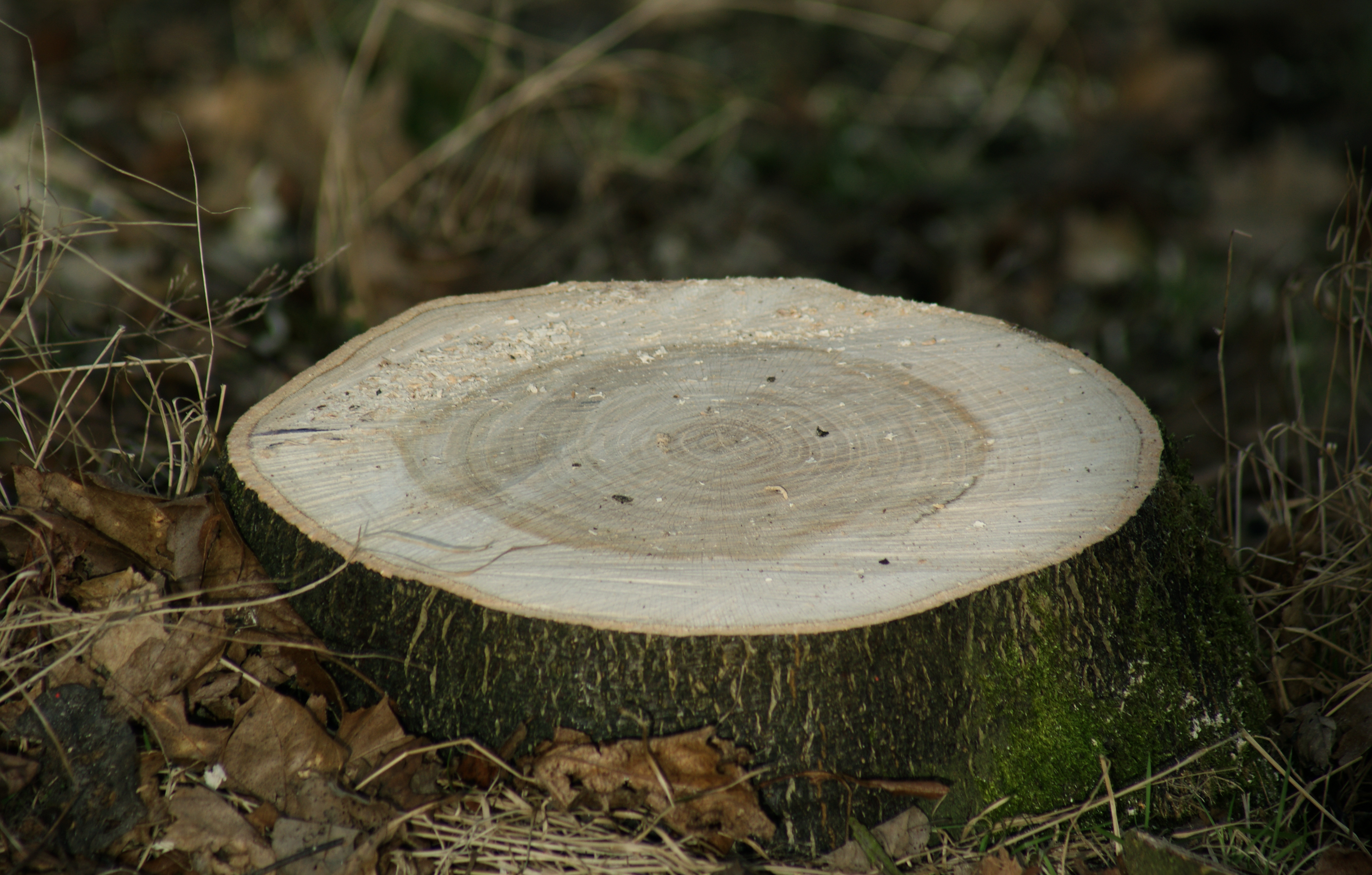
A freshly cut tree stump, two hours after cutting

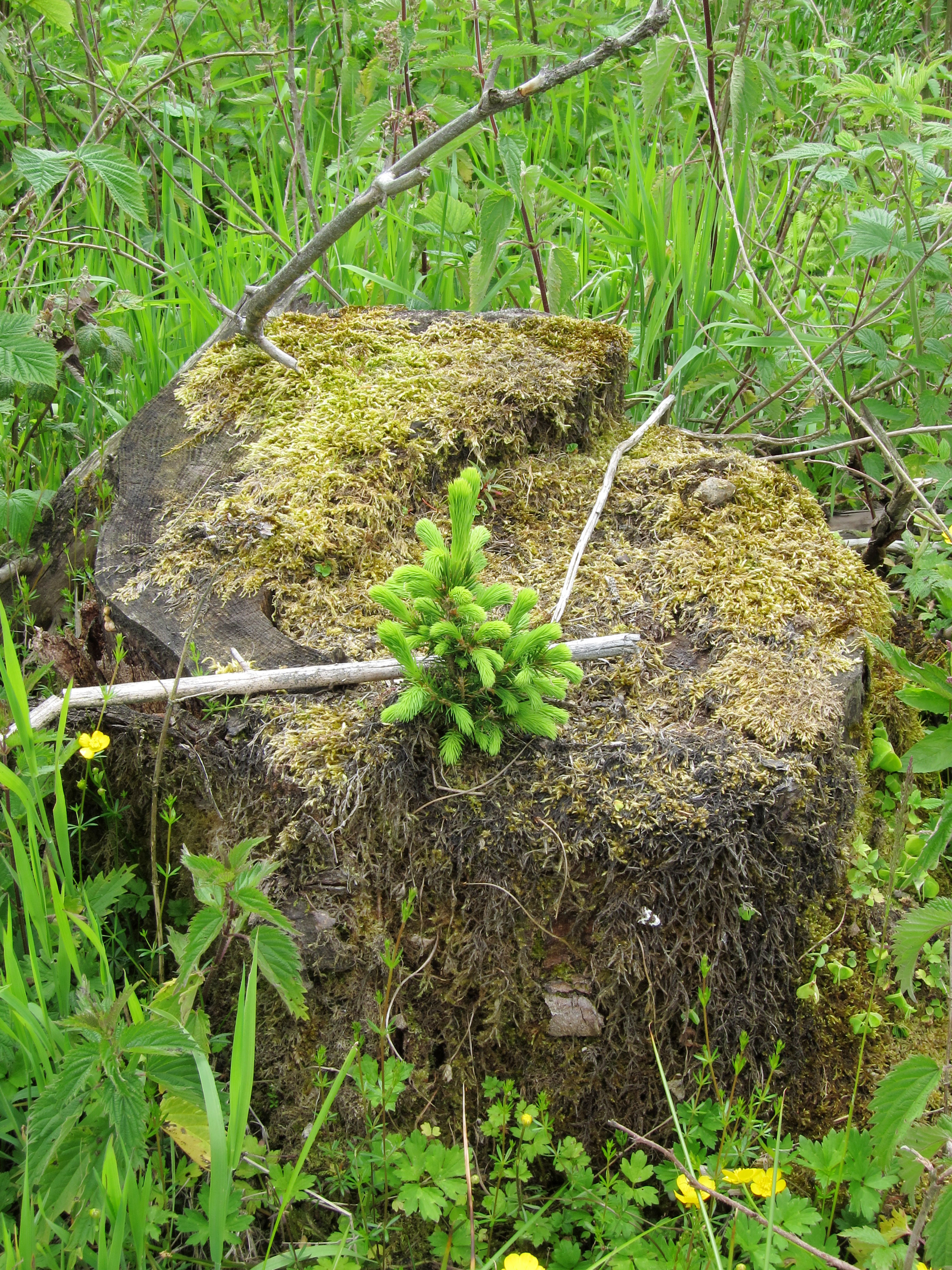
A saprobiontic young spruce on a stump

The process of deliberately cutting a tree to a stump to regrow is known as coppicing.

== Stump removal ==
Tree stumps can be difficult to remove from the ground. They can be dug out, pulled out by a chain, shredded with a stump grinder or burnt.

A common method for stump removal is to use one of the many chemical stump removal products, so long as immediate results are not needed. These stump removers are mostly made of potassium nitrate (KNO_{3}) and act by rapidly increasing the decay of the stump. (The chemical provides nitrogen, a limiting nutrient, to tree-decaying fungi. Other nitrogen fertilizers also work.) After an average of 4–6 weeks, the stump will be rotten through and easily fragmented into manageable pieces. If time is a limiting factor, treating the stump with potassium nitrate helps dry it out faster, making it easier to burn.

Historically, an explosive called stumping powder was used to blast stumps.

== Stump harvesting ==
In plantation forests in parts of Europe, stumps are sometimes pulled out of the ground using a specially adapted tracked excavator, to supply wood fuel for biomass power stations. Stump harvesting may provide an increasing component of the woody material required by the biomass power sector.

== See also ==
- Living stump
