= Liolaemus reichei =

Scientific classification
- Kingdom: Animalia
- Phylum: Chordata
- Class: Reptilia
- Order: Squamata
- Suborder: Iguania
- Family: Liolaemidae
- Genus: Liolaemus
- Species: L. reichei

Binomial name
- Liolaemus reichei (Werner, 1907)

Species of lizard

Liolaemus reichei or Dragón de Reiche, is a species of lizard in the family Liolaemidae. It is native to Chile. This species is small, with a maximum snout–vent length of 50.82 mm, has non-evident sexual dichromatism, and precloacal pores are present only in males. It inhabits absolute desert, occupying terrestrial biotopes with sandy and stony substrates.
