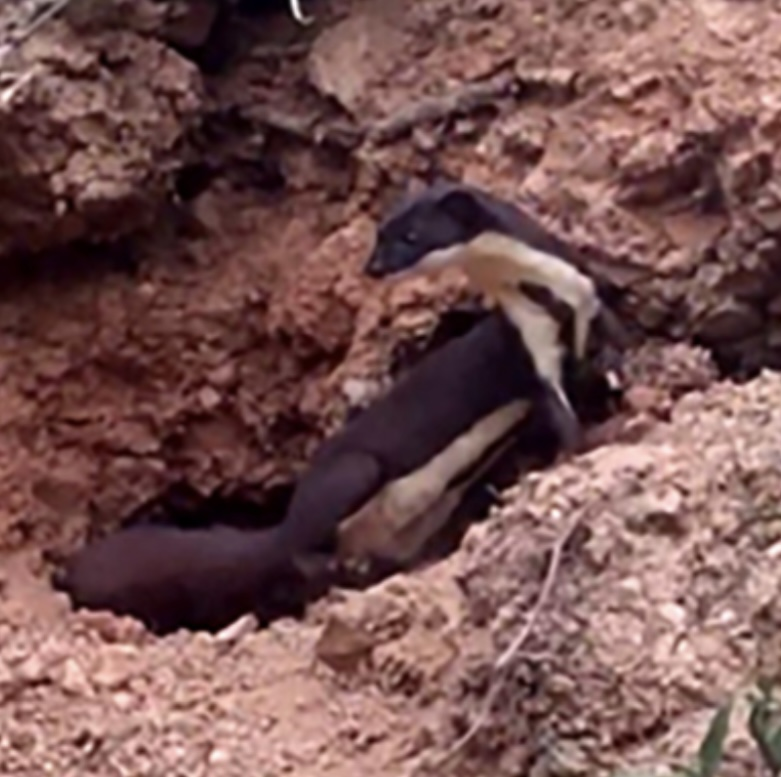

Conservation status
- Least Concern (IUCN 3.1)

Scientific classification
- Kingdom: Animalia
- Phylum: Chordata
- Class: Mammalia
- Order: Carnivora
- Family: Mustelidae
- Genus: Neogale
- Subgenus: Grammogale
- Species: N. africana

Binomial name
- Neogale africana (Desmarest, 1818)
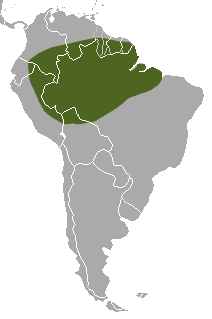
- Amazon weasel range

Synonyms
- Mustela africana; Grammogale africana

= Amazon weasel =

Species of carnivore

The Amazon weasel (Neogale africana), also known as the tropical weasel, is a species of New World weasel native to South America. It was first identified from a museum specimen mislabelled as coming from Africa, hence the scientific name.

== Taxonomy ==
Originally described in the genus Mustela, a 2021 study reclassified it into the genus Neogale along with two other former Mustela species, as well as the two species formerly classified in Neovison.

== Description ==
The largest of the three species of South American weasel, Amazon weasels measure 43 to 52 cm (17 to 20 in) in total length, including a tail 16 to 21 cm (6.3 to 8.3 in) long. They have a typical body form for weasels, with a long, slender, torso and short legs and ears. They have short fur which varies from reddish to dark brown on the upper body, and is pale orange-tan on the underparts. A stripe of fur the same colour as that on the upper body runs down the centre of the chest and throat. The whiskers are short and the soles of the feet almost hairless. Females have three pairs of teats.

== Distribution and habitat ==
Amazon weasels are known to inhabit the Amazon basin in north-central Brazil, northern Bolivia and eastern Peru and Ecuador. However, the full extent of their range is unknown, and they probably also inhabit southern Colombia, Venezuela and the Guyanas. The region is covered by tropical rainforest, and, while detailed habitat preferences are unknown, the weasel has mostly been recovered near rivers. The Amazon weasel exhibits a unique scale-dependent pattern of habitat selection, favoring specific microhabitats characterized by varying vegetation density and prey availability, which is crucial for its survival in tropical and subtropical forests.

Two subspecies are recognised:

- N. a. africana (northeastern Brazil)
- N. a. stolzmanni (northwestern Brazil, Peru, Ecuador)

== Biology and behaviour ==
The Amazon weasel is rarely seen and little is known of its habits. They eat rodents and other small mammals, and have been reported to construct burrows in the stumps of hollow trees. They have been found from sea level to 1,400 m (4,600 ft), and have been reported to swim in rivers or estuaries, sometimes far from the shore.

== Conservation status ==
The Amazon weasel is considered a Data Deficient species because scientists know little about them. Their population is unknown and they have only been registered anywhere 24 times (as of July 2024). An Amazon weasel had never been filmed until 2024, when some coffee producers captured a short video of an individual in Bolivia as part of a citizen science monitoring program. Despite the extremely small number of observations, Amazon weasels are listed as a Least Concern species on the IUCN Red List of Threatened Species because scientists believe they still have a sizable population living in the Amazonian forest. It is not known whether this species can handle anthropogenic disturbances in the environment and their numbers may drop significantly in the future due to the deforestation of the Amazon rainforest.
