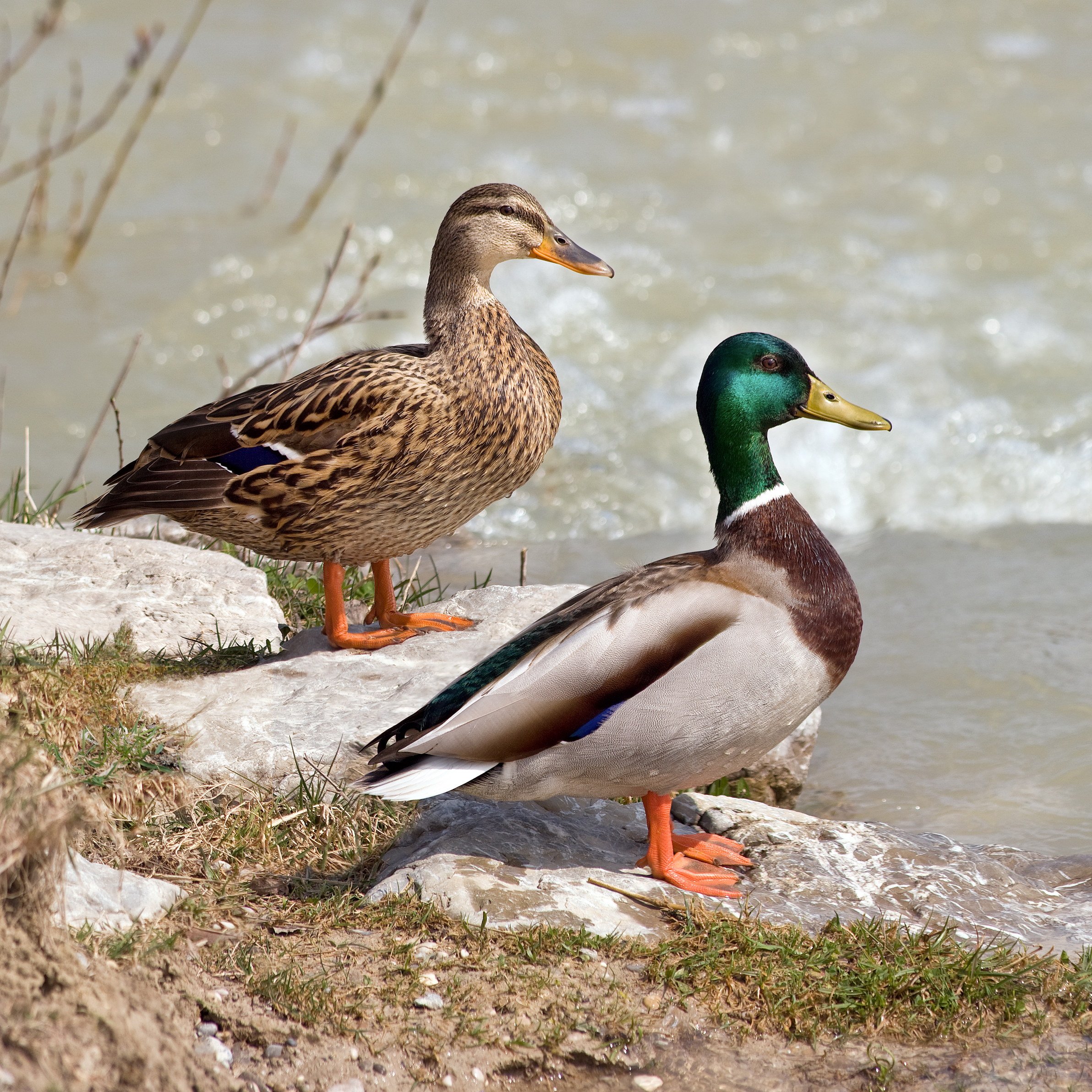
- Female (left) and male (right) in Strasslach-Dingharting, Germany

Conservation status
- Least Concern (IUCN 3.1)

- Secure (NatureServe)

Scientific classification
- Kingdom: Animalia
- Phylum: Chordata
- Class: Aves
- Order: Anseriformes
- Family: Anatidae
- Genus: Anas
- Species: A. platyrhynchos

Binomial name
- Anas platyrhynchos Linnaeus, 1758

Subspecies
- A. p. platyrhynchos Linnaeus, 1758; A. p. conboschas C. L. Brehm, 1831
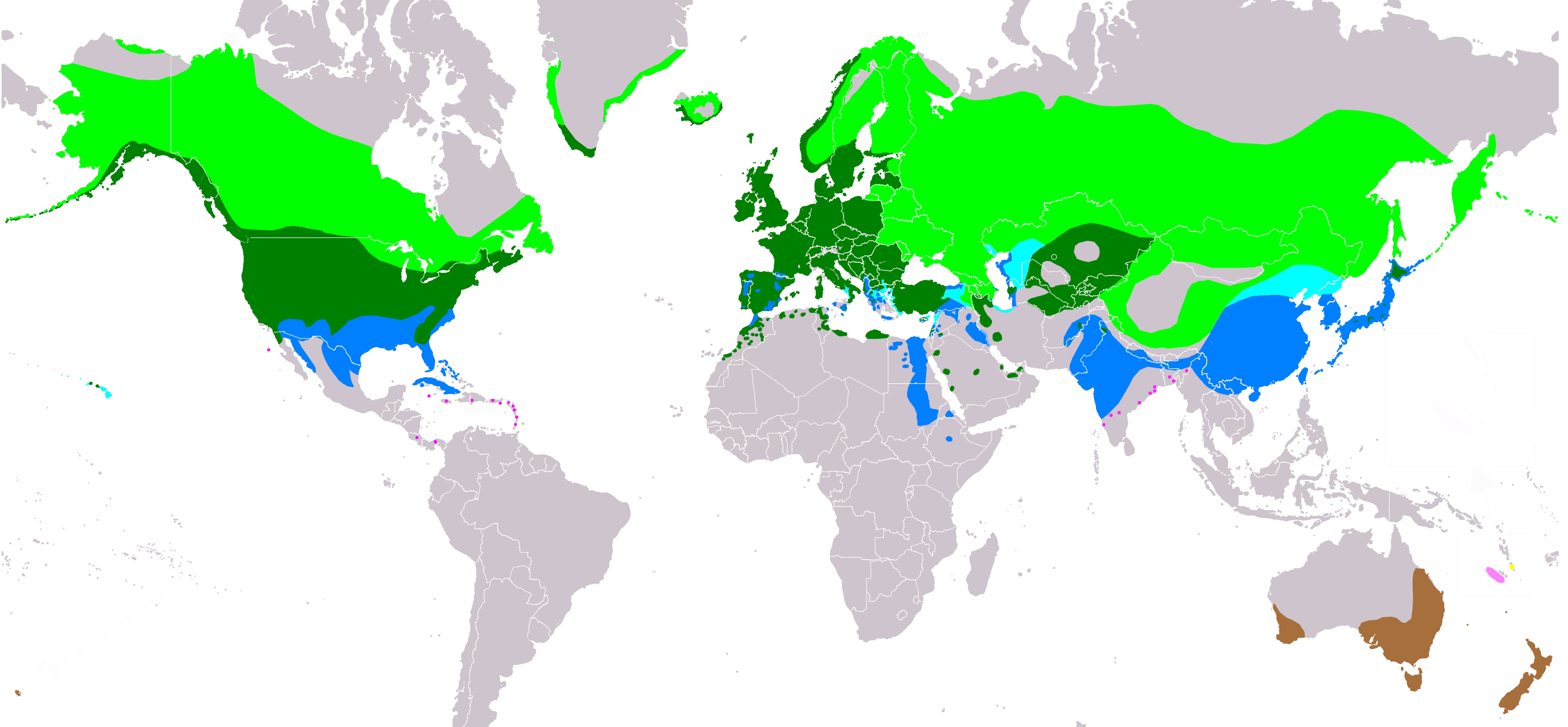
- Range of A. platyrhynchos Breeding Resident Passage Non-breeding Vagrant (seasonality uncertain) Possibly extant and introduced Extant and introduced (seasonality uncertain) Possibly extant and introduced (seasonality uncertain)

Synonyms
- Anas boschas Linnaeus, 1758; Anas adunca Linnaeus, 1758

Audio
- Sound of female

= Mallard =

Mallard Temporal range: Zanclean–present (Note: Fossil remains are known from between 5.33 and 3.6 million years ago.)

Species of duck

The mallard (/ˈmælərd, -ɑːrd/) or wild duck (Anas platyrhynchos) is a dabbling duck that breeds throughout temperate and subtropical North America, Eurasia, and North Africa. It has been introduced to New Zealand, Australia, Peru, Brazil, Uruguay, Argentina, Chile, Colombia, the Falkland Islands, and South Africa. Belonging to the subfamily Anatinae of the waterfowl family Anatidae, mallards live in wetlands, eat water plants and small animals, and are social animals preferring to congregate in groups or flocks of varying sizes.

Males (drakes) have green heads, while the females (ducks) have mainly brown-speckled plumage. Both sexes have an area of white-bordered black or iridescent purple or blue feathers called a speculum on their wings; males especially tend to have blue speculum feathers. The mallard is 50–65 cm (20–26 in) long, of which the body makes up around two-thirds the length. The wingspan is 81–98 cm (32–39 in) and the bill is 4.4 to 6.1 cm (1.7 to 2.4 in) long. It is often slightly heavier than most other dabbling ducks, weighing 0.7–1.6 kg (1.5–3.5 lb).

The female lays 8 to 13 creamy white to greenish-buff spotless eggs, on alternate days. Incubation takes 27 to 28 days and fledging takes 50 to 60 days. The ducklings are precocial and fully capable of swimming as soon as they hatch.

The non-migratory mallard interbreeds with indigenous wild ducks of closely related species through genetic pollution by producing fertile offspring. Complete hybridisation of various species of wild duck gene pools could result in the extinction of many indigenous waterfowl. This species is the main ancestor of most breeds of domestic duck, and its naturally evolved wild gene pool has been genetically polluted by the domestic and feral mallard populations.

The mallard is considered to be a species of least concern by the International Union for Conservation of Nature (IUCN), and, unlike many waterfowl, is considered an invasive species in some regions. It is a very adaptable species, being able to live and even thrive in urban areas which may have supported more localised, sensitive species of waterfowl before development.

== Taxonomy and evolutionary history ==
The mallard was one of the many bird species originally described in the 1758 10th edition of Systema Naturae by Carl Linnaeus. He gave it two binomial names: Anas platyrhynchos and Anas boschas. The latter was generally preferred until 1906 when Einar Lönnberg established that A. platyrhynchos had priority, as it appeared on an earlier page in the text. The scientific name comes from Latin Anas, "duck" and Ancient Greek πλατυρυγχος, platyrhynchus, "broad-billed" (from πλατύς, platys, "broad" and ρυγχός, rhunkhos, "bill"). The genome of Anas platyrhynchos was sequenced in 2013.

The name mallard originally referred to any wild drake, and it is sometimes still used this way. It was derived from the Old French malart or mallart for "wild drake" although its true derivation is unclear. It may be related to, or at least influenced by, an Old High German masculine proper name Madelhart, clues lying in the alternative English forms "maudelard" and "mawdelard". Masle (male) has also been proposed as an influence.

Mallards frequently interbreed with their closest relatives in the genus Anas, such as the American black duck, and also with species more distantly related, such as the northern pintail, leading to various hybrids that may be fully fertile. The mallard has hybridised with more than 40 species in the wild, and an additional 20 species in captivity, though fertile hybrids typically have two Anas parents. Mallards and their domestic conspecifics are fully interfertile; many wild mallard populations in North America contain significant amounts of domestic mallard DNA.

Genetic analysis has shown that certain mallards appear to be closer to their Indo-Pacific relatives, while others are related to their American relatives. Mitochondrial DNA data for the D-loop sequence suggest that mallards may have evolved in the general area of Siberia. Mallard bones rather abruptly appear in food remains of ancient humans and other deposits of fossil bones in Europe, without a good candidate for a local predecessor species. The large Ice Age palaeosubspecies that made up at least the European and West Asian populations during the Pleistocene has been named Anas platyrhynchos palaeoboschas.

Mallards are differentiated in their mitochondrial DNA between North American and Eurasian populations, but the nuclear genome displays a notable lack of genetic structure. Haplotypes typical of American mallard relatives and eastern spot-billed ducks can be found in mallards around the Bering Sea. The Aleutian Islands hold a population of mallards that appear to be evolving towards becoming a subspecies, as gene flow with other populations is very limited.

Also, the paucity of morphological differences between the Old World mallards and the New World mallard demonstrates the extent to which the genome is shared among them such that birds like the eastern spot-billed duck are highly similar to the Old World mallard, and birds such as the Hawaiian duck are highly similar to the New World mallard.

=== Subspecies ===
Two subspecies are currently accepted:

Image	Scientific name	Distribution	Characteristics
Sisimiut, Greenland	A. p. conboschas C. L. Brehm, 1831	Greenland, resident endemic.	Slightly larger, but with a smaller bill (an example of Bergmann's rule); paler plumage, and stockier body.
Kłodzko, Poland	A. p. platyrhynchos	Holarctic, except for Greenland.	The size of the nominate subspecies of mallard varies clinally. Note that domesticated ducks, although often cited as "A. p. domesticus", do not comprise a valid distinct subspecies; they are derived from within A. p. platyrhynchos.

In the past, several other ducks, now treated as distinct species, were sometimes treated as subspecies of mallard:

- Laysan duck Anas laysanensis
- Hawaiian duck Anas wyvilliana
- Mottled duck Anas fulvigula
- American black duck Anas rubripes
- Mexican duck Anas diazi

== Description ==
The mallard is a medium-large waterfowl species that is heavier than most other dabbling ducks. It is 50–65 cm (20–26 in) long, of which the body makes up around two-thirds, and has a wingspan of 81–98 cm (32–39 in); it weighs 0.7–1.6 kg (1.5–3.5 lb). Among standard measurements, the wing chord is 25.7 to 30.6 cm (10.1 to 12.0 in), the bill is 4.4 to 6.1 cm (1.7 to 2.4 in), and the tarsus is 4.1 to 4.8 cm (1.6 to 1.9 in).

Adult drake mallard

The breeding male mallard is unmistakable, with a glossy bottle-green head and a white collar that demarcates the head and neck from the purple-tinged brown breast, grey-brown wings, and a pale grey belly. The rear of the male is black, with white-bordered dark tail feathers. The bill of the male is a yellowish-orange tipped with black, with that of the female generally darker and ranging from black to mottled orange and brown. The female mallard is predominantly mottled, with each individual feather showing sharp contrast from buff to very dark brown, a coloration shared by most female dabbling ducks, and has buff cheeks, eyebrow, throat, and neck, with a darker crown and eye-stripe. Mallards, like other sexually-dimorphic birds, can sometimes go through spontaneous sex reversal, often caused by damaged or nonfunctioning sex organs, such as the ovaries. This phenomenon can cause female mallards to exhibit male plumage.

Both male and female mallards have distinct iridescent purple-blue speculum feathers edged with white, which are prominent in flight or at rest but temporarily shed during the annual summer moult.

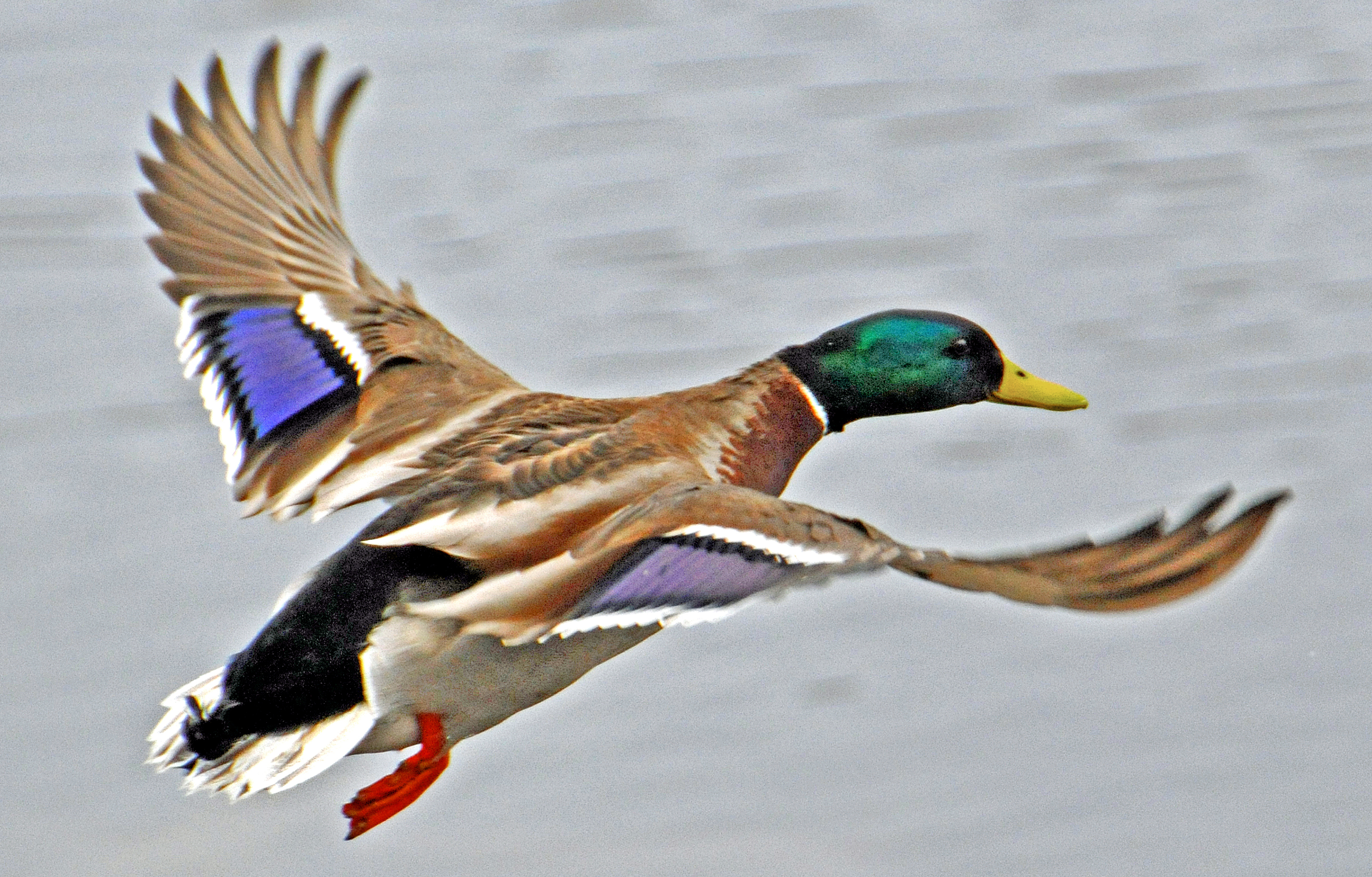
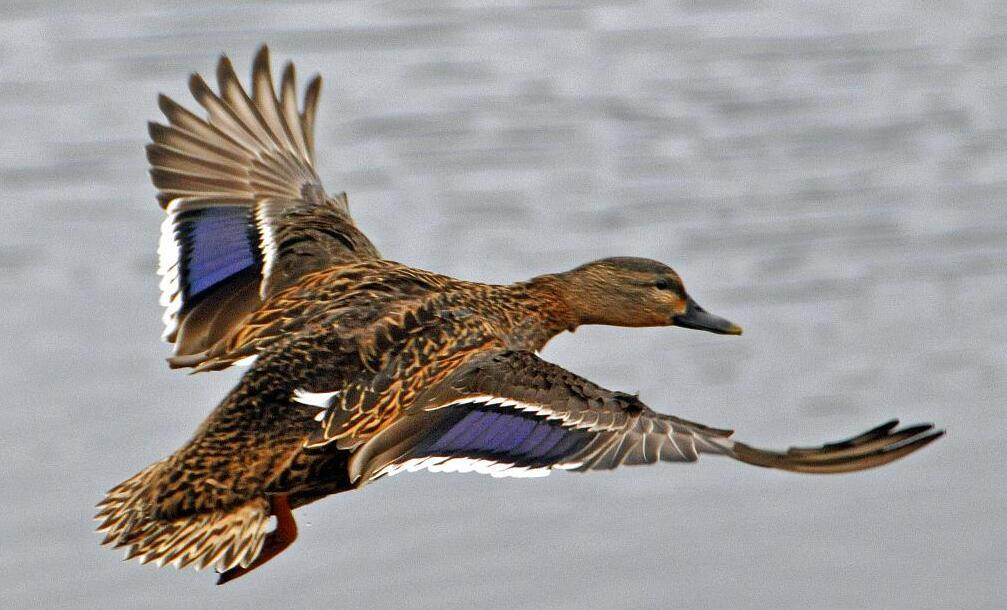
Showing speculum feathers:
male (top) and female (bottom)

Upon hatching, the plumage of the duckling is yellow on the underside and face (with streaks by the eyes) and black on the back (with some yellow spots) all the way to the top and back of the head. Its legs and bill are also black. As it nears a month in age, the duckling's plumage starts becoming drab, looking more like the female, though more streaked, and its legs lose their dark grey colouring. Two months after hatching, the fledgling period has ended, and the duckling is now a juvenile. The duckling is able to fly 50–60 days after hatching. Its bill soon loses its dark grey colouring, and its sex can finally be distinguished visually by three factors: 1) the bill is yellow in males, but black and orange in females; 2) the breast feathers are reddish-brown in males, but brown in females; and 3) in males, the centre tail feather (drake feather) is curled, but in females, the centre tail feather is straight. During the final period of maturity leading up to adulthood (6–10 months of age), the plumage of female juveniles remains the same while the plumage of male juveniles gradually changes to its characteristic colours. This change in plumage also applies to adult mallard males when they transition in and out of their non-breeding eclipse plumage at the beginning and the end of the summer moulting period. The adulthood age for mallards is fourteen months, and the average life expectancy is three years, but they can live to twenty.

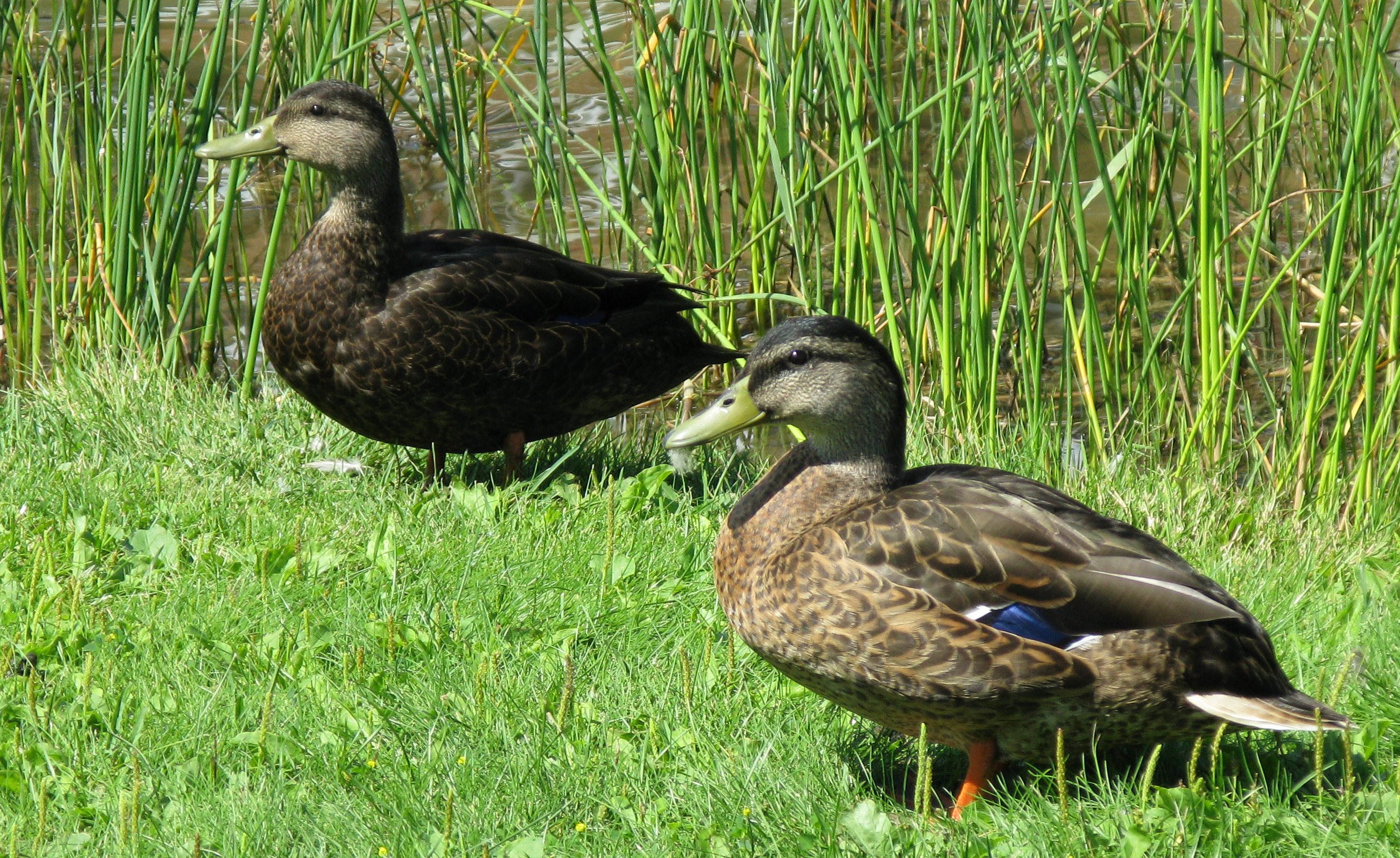
An American black duck (upper left) and a male mallard (lower right) in eclipse plumage

Several species of duck have brown-plumaged females that can be confused with the female mallard. The female gadwall (Mareca strepera) has an orange-lined bill, white belly, black and white speculum that is seen as a white square on the wings in flight, and is a smaller bird. More similar to the female mallard in North America are the American black duck (A. rubripes), which is notably darker-hued in both sexes than the mallard, and the mottled duck (A. fulvigula), which is somewhat darker than the female mallard, and with slightly different bare-part colouration and no white edge on the speculum.

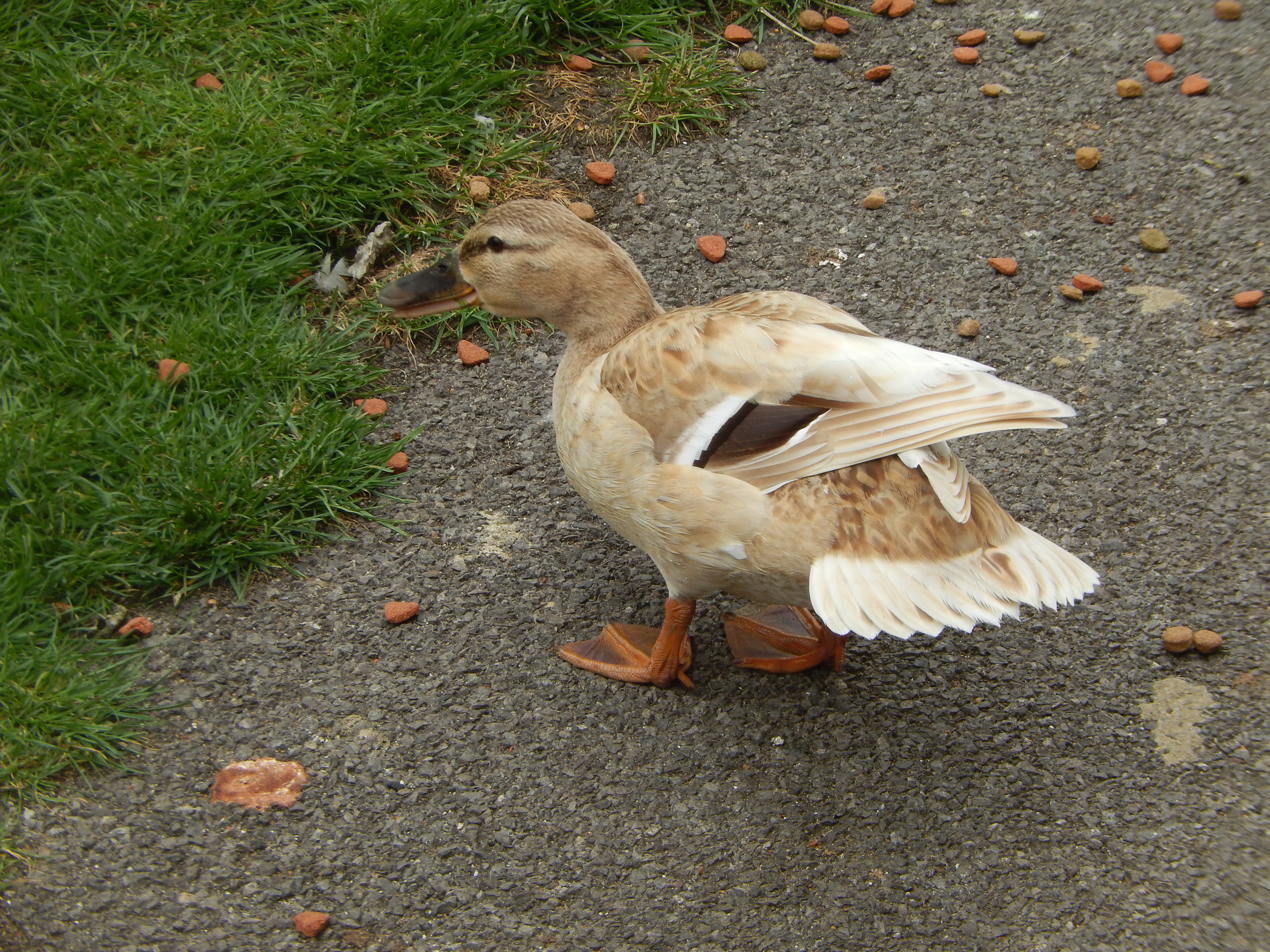
Mallards are among the most common bird species to exhibit aberrant colouration, typically due to the influence of escaped domesticated ducks, more rarely to genetic mutations. The female pictured here is leucistic; leucism in birds often results in 'cream-coloured', 'apricot' or muted feathers on certain parts of the body.

In captivity, domestic ducks come in wild-type plumages, white, and other colours. Most of these colour variants are also known in domestic mallards not bred as livestock, but kept as pets, aviary birds, etc., where they are rare but increasing in availability.

The mallard is a rare example of both Allen's Rule and Bergmann's Rule in birds. Bergmann's Rule, which states that polar forms tend to be larger than related ones from warmer climates, has numerous examples in birds, as in case of the Greenland mallard which is larger than the mallards further south. Allen's Rule says that appendages like ears tend to be smaller in polar forms to minimise heat loss, and larger in tropical and desert equivalents to facilitate heat diffusion, and that the polar taxa are stockier overall. Examples of this rule in birds are rare as they lack external ears, but the bill of ducks is supplied with a few blood vessels to prevent heat loss, and, as in the Greenland mallard, the bill is smaller than that of birds farther south, illustrating the rule.

Due to the variability of the mallard's genetic code, which gives it its vast interbreeding capability, mutations in the genes that decide plumage colour are very common and have resulted in a wide variety of hybrids, such as Brewer's duck (mallard × gadwall, Mareca strepera).

=== Vocal behaviour ===
Call
A group of mallards quacking

A noisy species, the female has the deep quack stereotypically associated with ducks. The female will often call with a sequence of 2–10 quacks in a row, starting loud and with the volume gradually decreasing. Male mallards make a sound phonetically similar to that of the female, a typical quack, but it is deeper and quieter compared to that of the female. Research conducted by Middlesex University on two English mallard populations found that the vocalisations of the mallard varies depending on their environment and have something akin to a regional accent, with urban mallards in London being much louder and more vociferous compared to rural mallards in Cornwall, serving as an adaptation to persistent levels of anthropogenic noise.

When incubating a nest, or when offspring are present, females vocalise differently, making a call that sounds like a truncated version of the usual quack. This maternal vocalisation is highly attractive to their young. The repetition and frequency modulation of these quacks form the auditory basis for species identification in offspring, a process known as acoustic conspecific identification. In addition, females hiss if the nest or offspring are threatened or interfered with. When taking off, the wings of a mallard produce a characteristic faint whistling noise.

== Distribution and habitat ==
The mallard is widely distributed across the Northern and Southern Hemispheres; in North America its range extends from southern and central Alaska to Mexico, the Hawaiian Islands, across the Palearctic, from Iceland and southern Greenland and parts of Morocco (North Africa) in the west, Scandinavia and Britain to the north, and to Siberia, Japan, and South Korea. Also in the east, it ranges to south-eastern and south-western Australia and New Zealand in the Southern Hemisphere. It is strongly migratory in the northern parts of its breeding range, and winters farther south. For example, in North America, it winters south to the southern United States and northern Mexico, but also regularly strays into Central America and the Caribbean between September and May. A drake later named "Trevor" attracted media attention in 2018 when it turned up on the island of Niue, an atypical location for mallards.

The mallard inhabits a wide range of habitats and climates, from the Arctic tundra to subtropical regions. It is found in both fresh- and salt-water wetlands, including parks, small ponds, rivers, lakes and estuaries, as well as shallow inlets and open sea within sight of the coastline. Water depths of less than 0.9 metres (3.0 ft) are preferred, with birds avoiding areas more than a few metres deep. They are attracted to bodies of water with aquatic vegetation.

== Behaviour ==
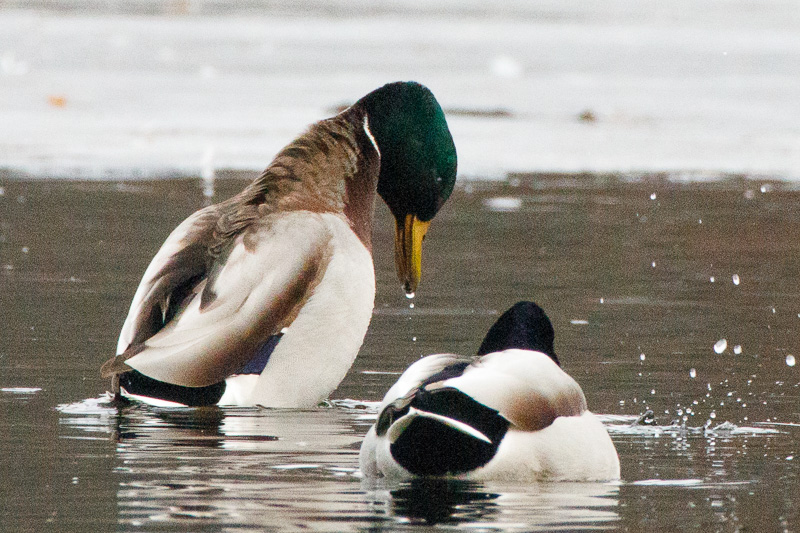
Drake mallard performing the grunt-whistle

=== Feeding ===
The mallard is omnivorous and very flexible in its choice of food. Its diet may vary based on several factors, including the stage of the breeding cycle, short-term variations in available food, nutrient availability, and interspecific and intraspecific competition. The majority of the mallard's diet seems to be made up of gastropods, insects (including beetles, flies, lepidopterans, dragonflies, and caddisflies), crustaceans, other arthropods, worms, feces of other birds, many varieties of seeds and plant matter, and roots and tubers. During the breeding season, male birds were recorded to have eaten 37.6% animal matter and 62.4% plant matter, most notably the grass Echinochloa crus-galli, and nonlaying females ate 37.0% animal matter and 63.0% plant matter, while laying females ate 71.9% animal matter and only 28.1% plant matter. Plants generally make up the larger part of a bird's diet, especially during autumn migration and in the winter.

The mallard usually feeds by dabbling for plant food or grazing; there are reports of it eating frogs, other amphibians, and fish, including carcasses. However, in 2017 a flock of mallards in Romania were observed hunting fledglings of small migratory birds when they land in the water, which included a grey wagtail and a black redstart. This was the first documented occasion they had been seen attacking and consuming large vertebrates. In 2026, this behaviour was also observed in New Zealand's Lake Alexandrina, with mallards observed preying upon the chicks of the pūteketeke and subsequently euthanised. It usually nests on a river bank, but not always near water. It is highly gregarious outside of the breeding season and forms large flocks, which are known as "sordes".

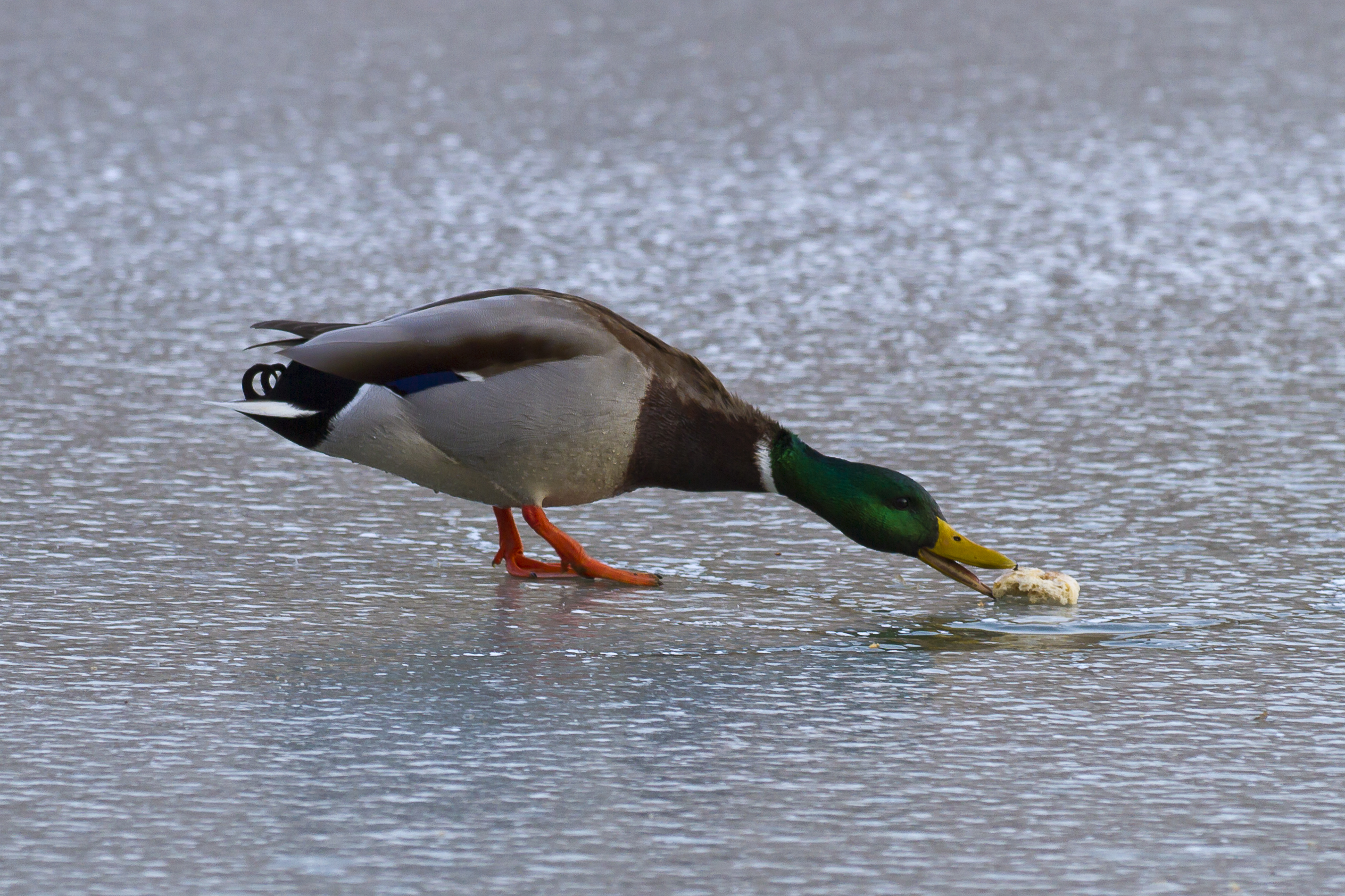
Eating bread

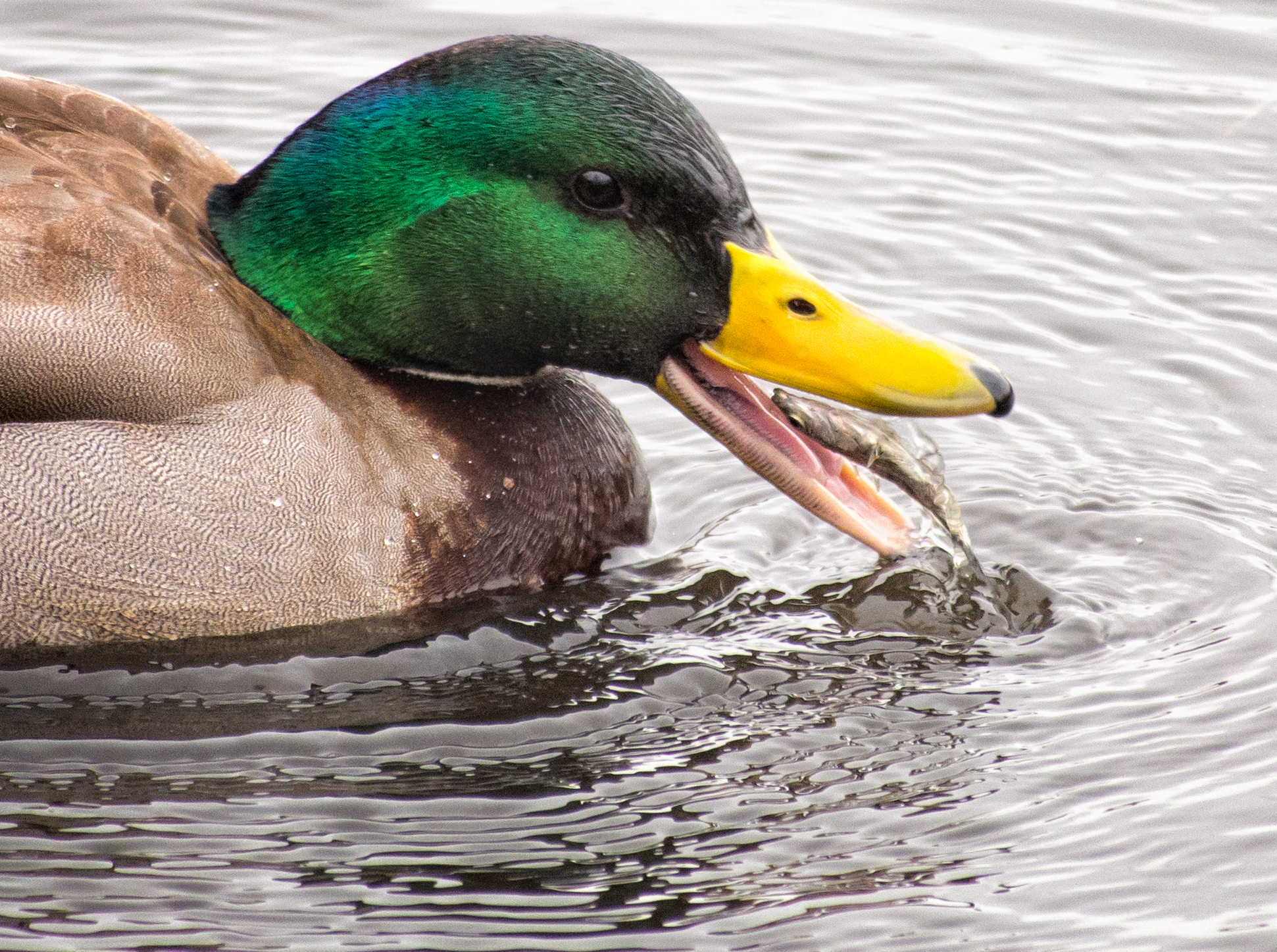
Eating a small fish

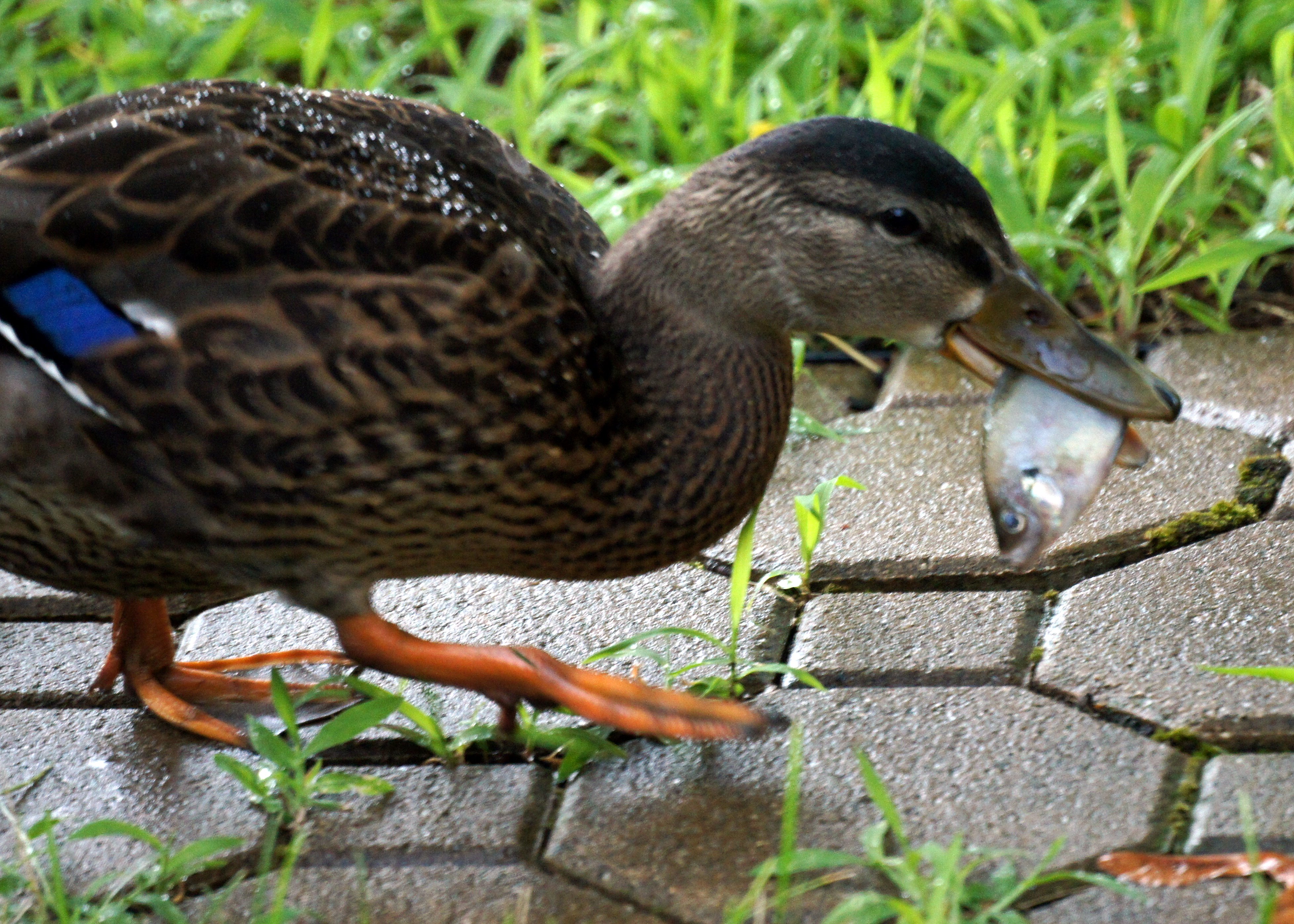
Eating a larger fish

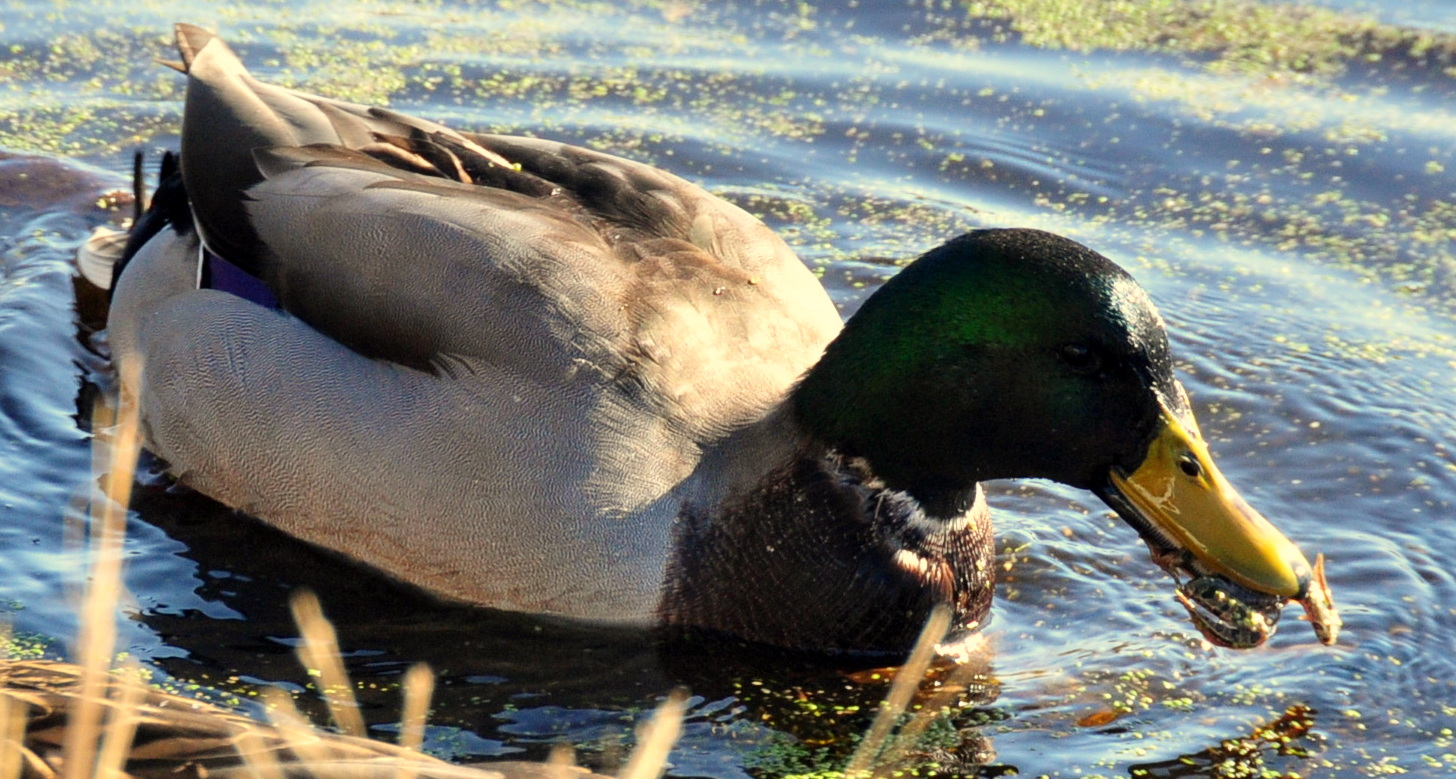
Eating a frog

=== Breeding ===
Mallards usually form pairs (in October and November in the Northern Hemisphere) until the female lays eggs at the start of the nesting season, which is around the beginning of spring. At this time she is left by the male who joins up with other males to await the moulting period, which begins in June (in the Northern Hemisphere). During the brief time before this, however, the males are still sexually potent and some of them either remain on standby to sire replacement clutches (for female mallards that have lost or abandoned their previous clutch) or forcibly mate with females that appear to be isolated or unattached regardless of their species and whether or not they have a brood of ducklings.

Growth series (from youngest to oldest)

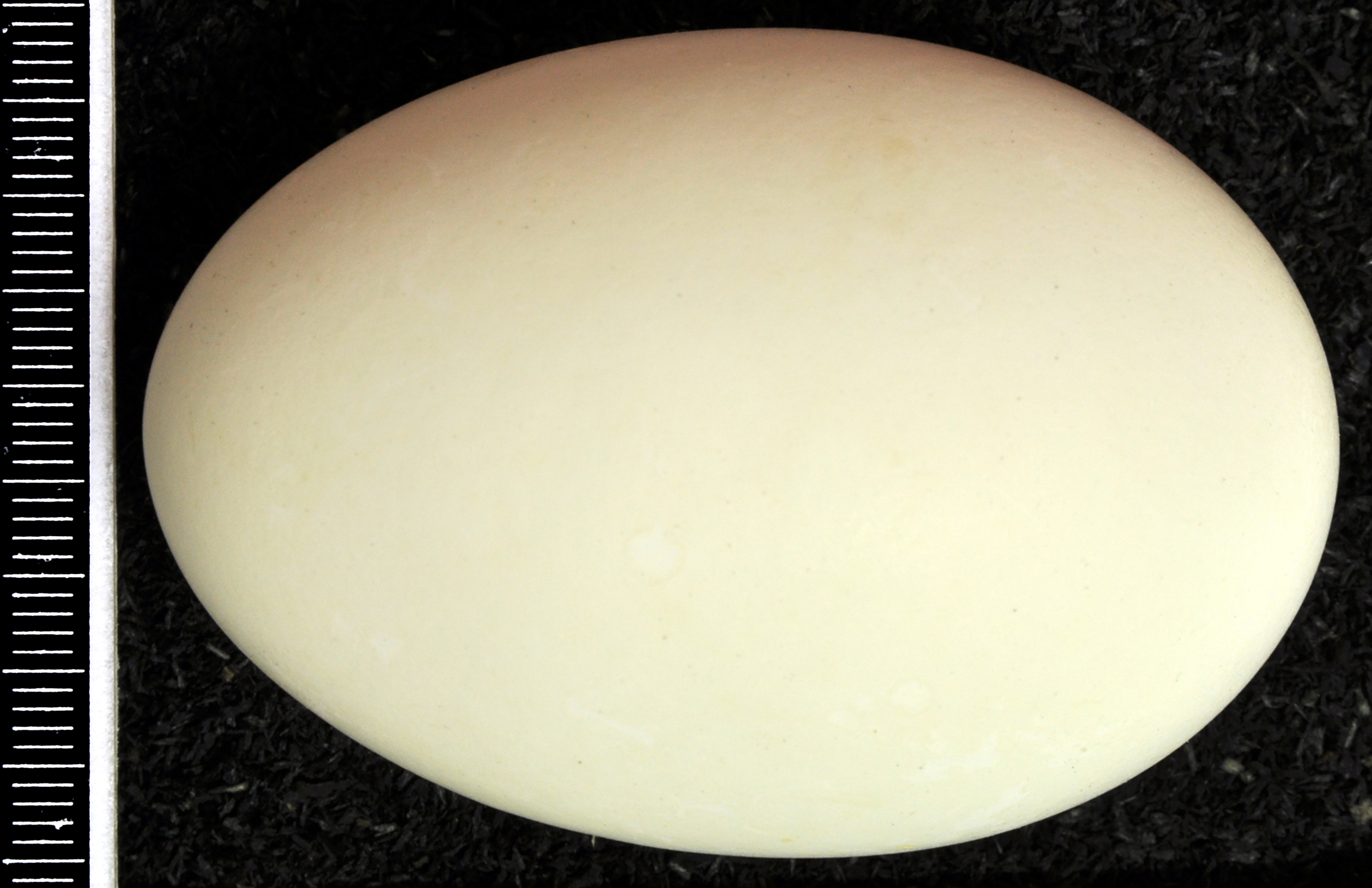
Egg

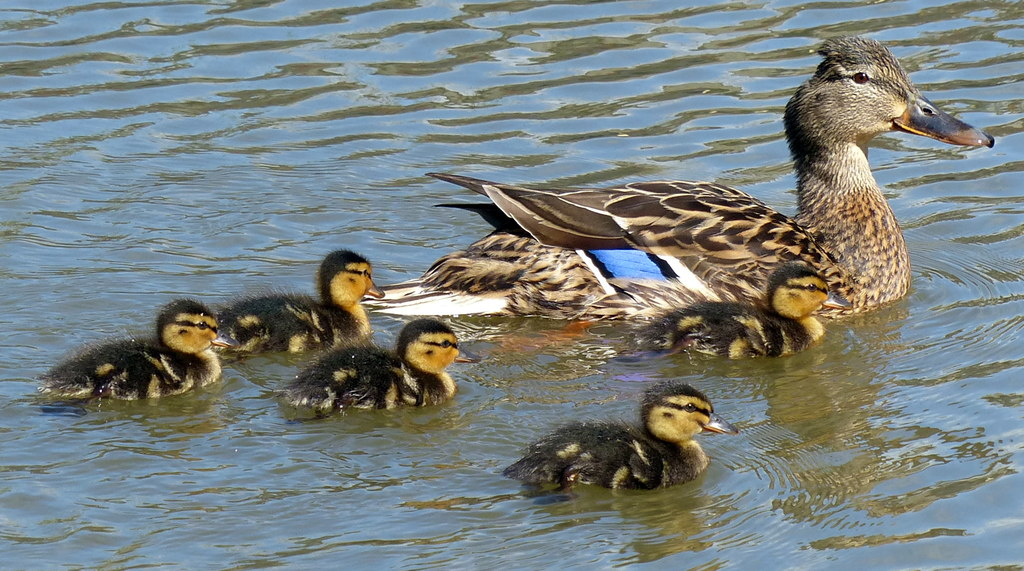
Young ducklings

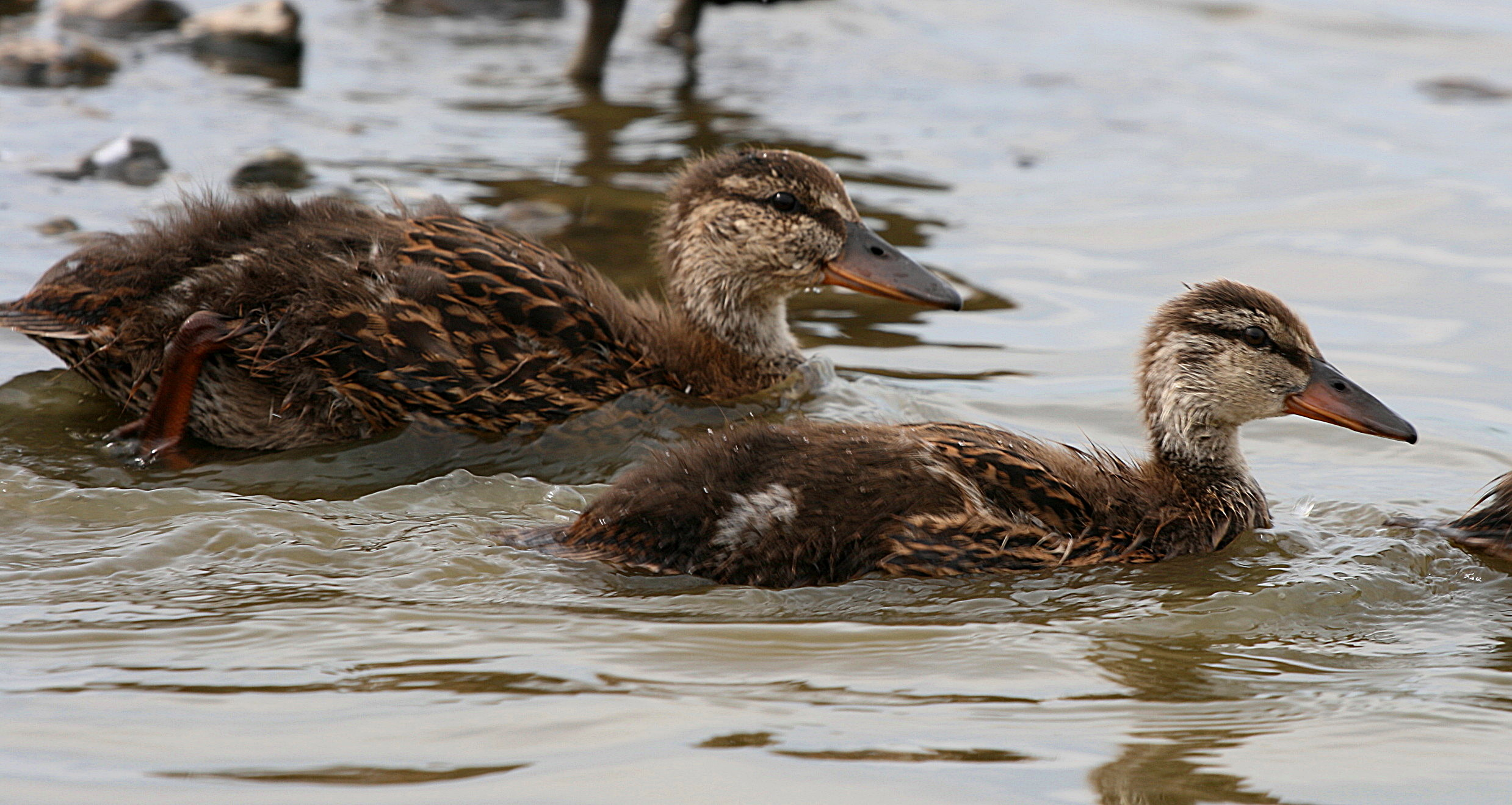
Older ducklings

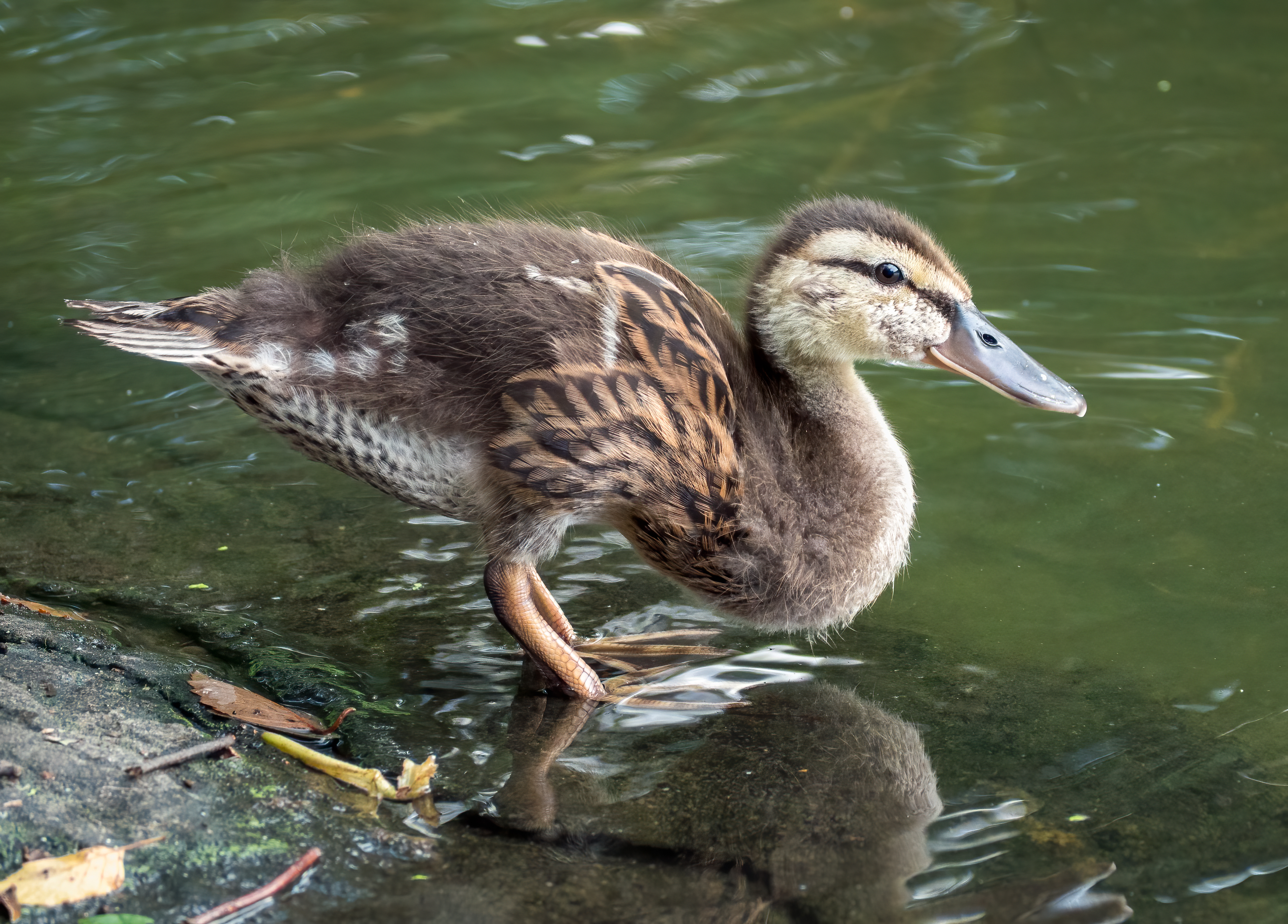
Moulting

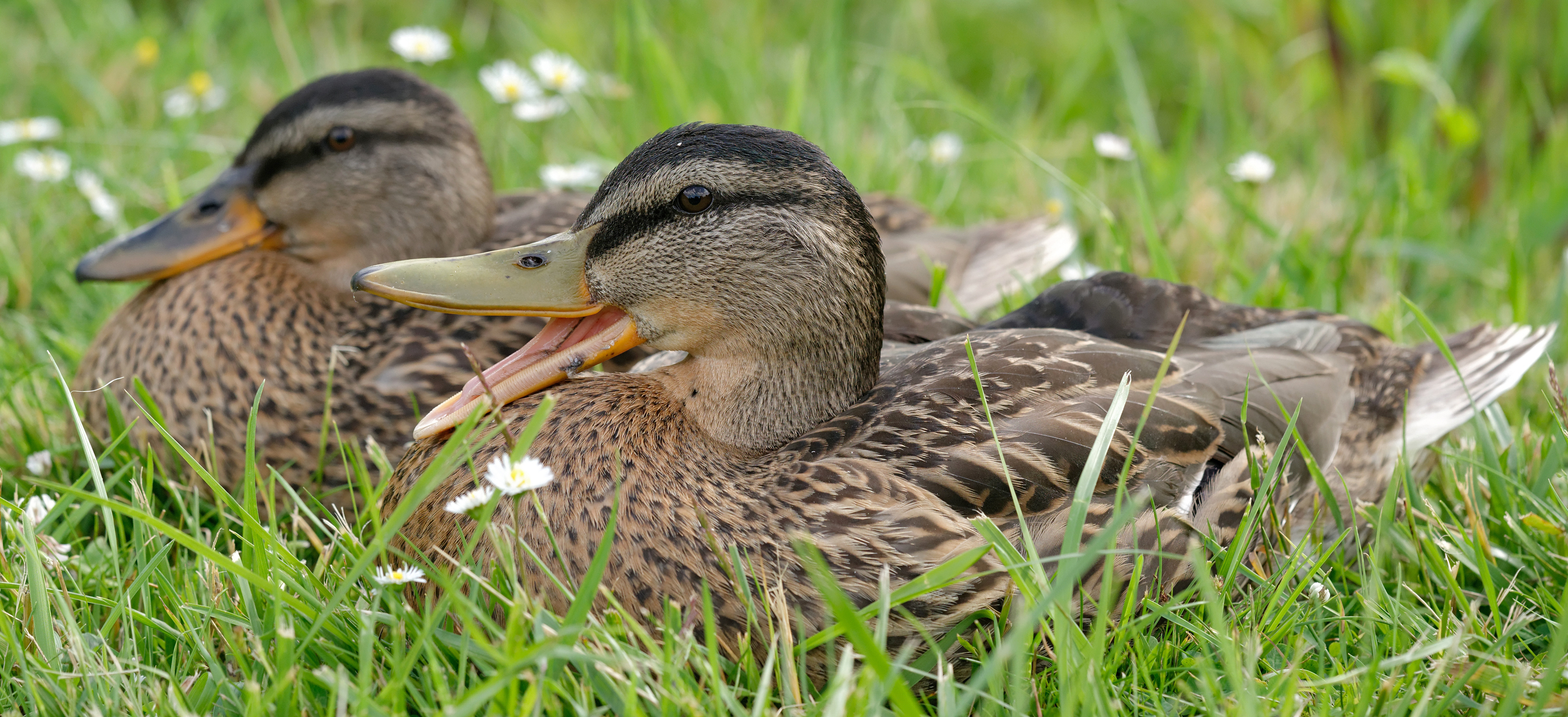
Fledgling female and male

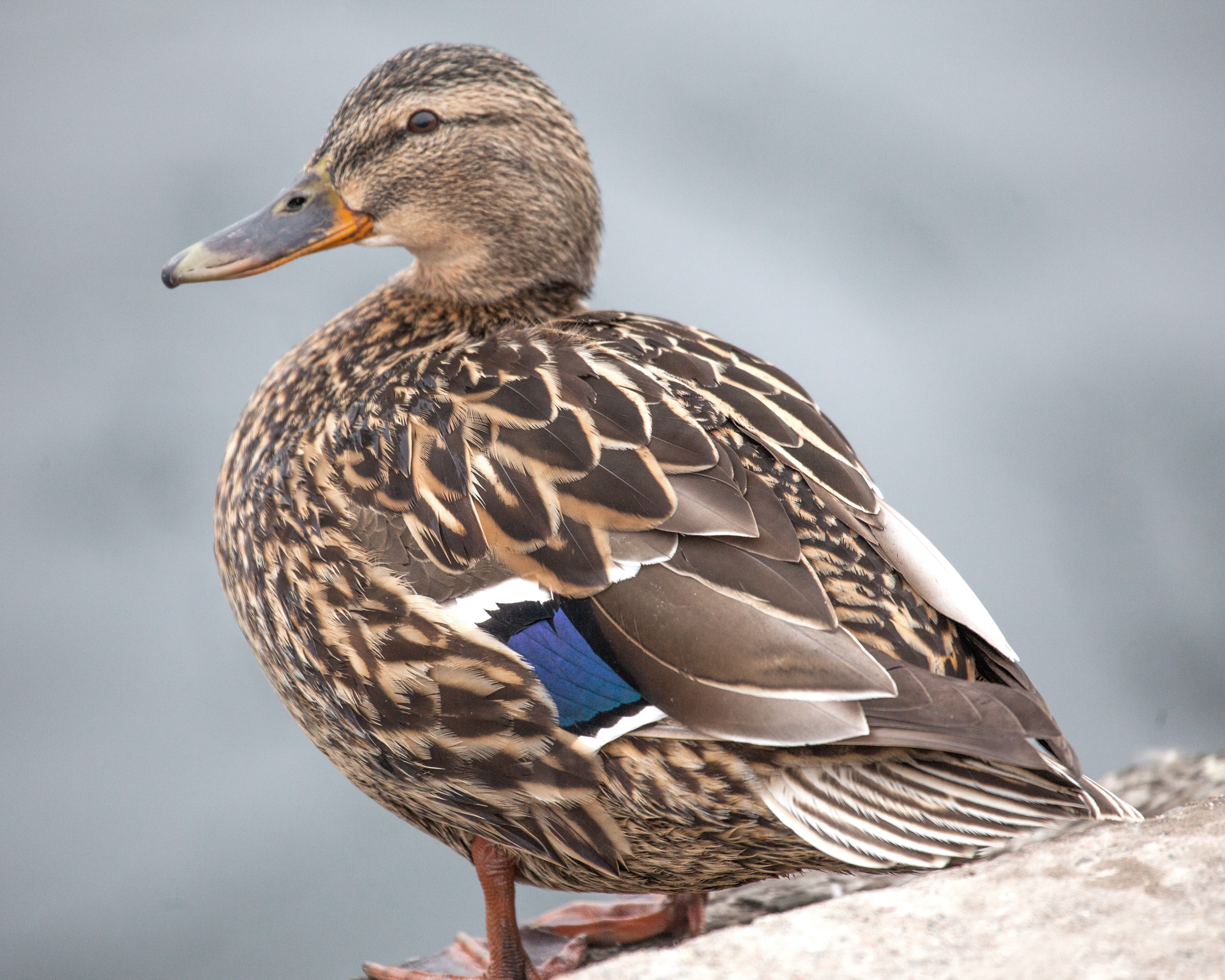
Adult female

Nesting sites are typically on the ground, hidden in vegetation where the female's speckled plumage serves as effective camouflage, but female mallards have also been known to nest in hollows in trees, boathouses, roof gardens and on balconies, sometimes resulting in hatched offspring having difficulty following their parent to water.

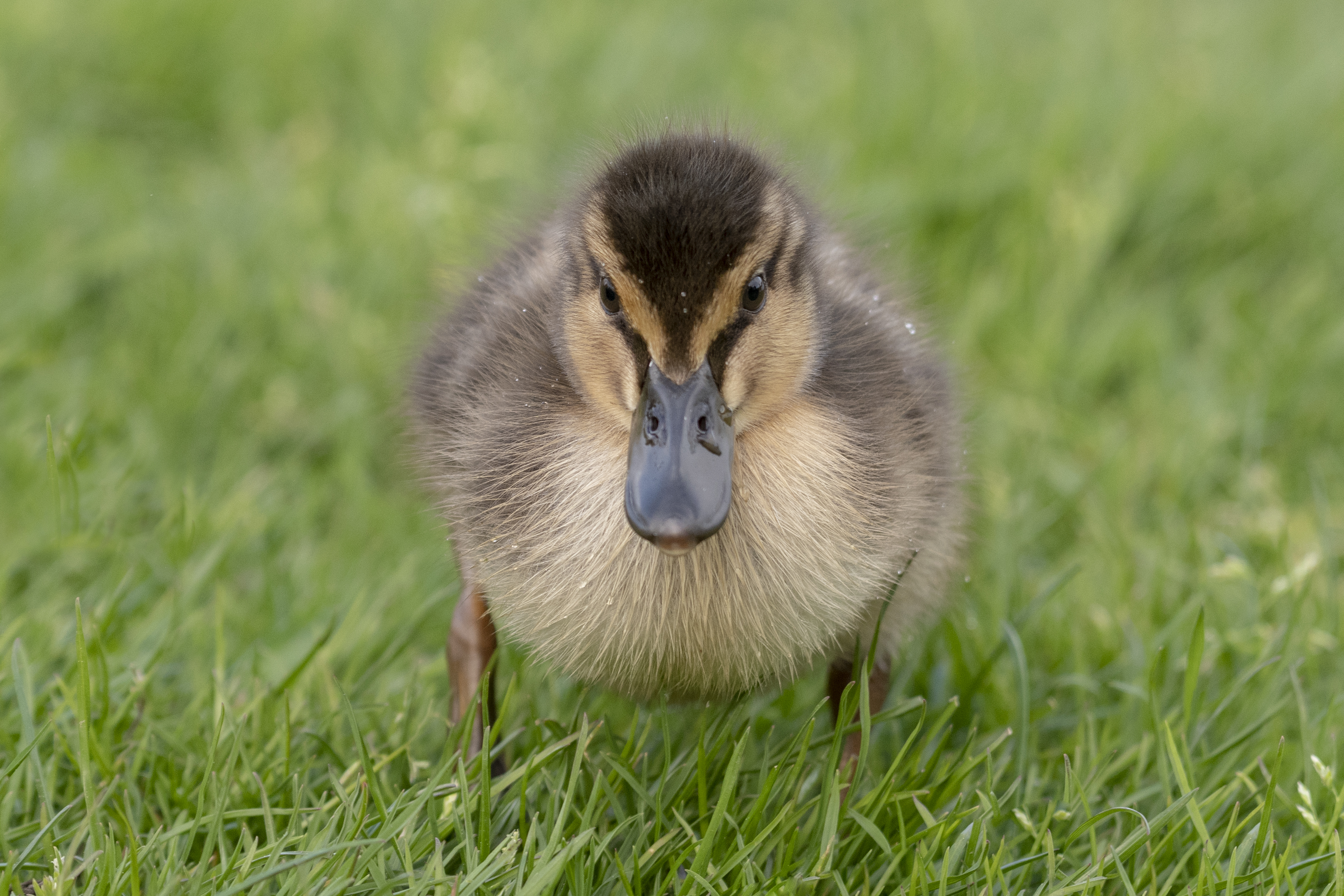
Duckling

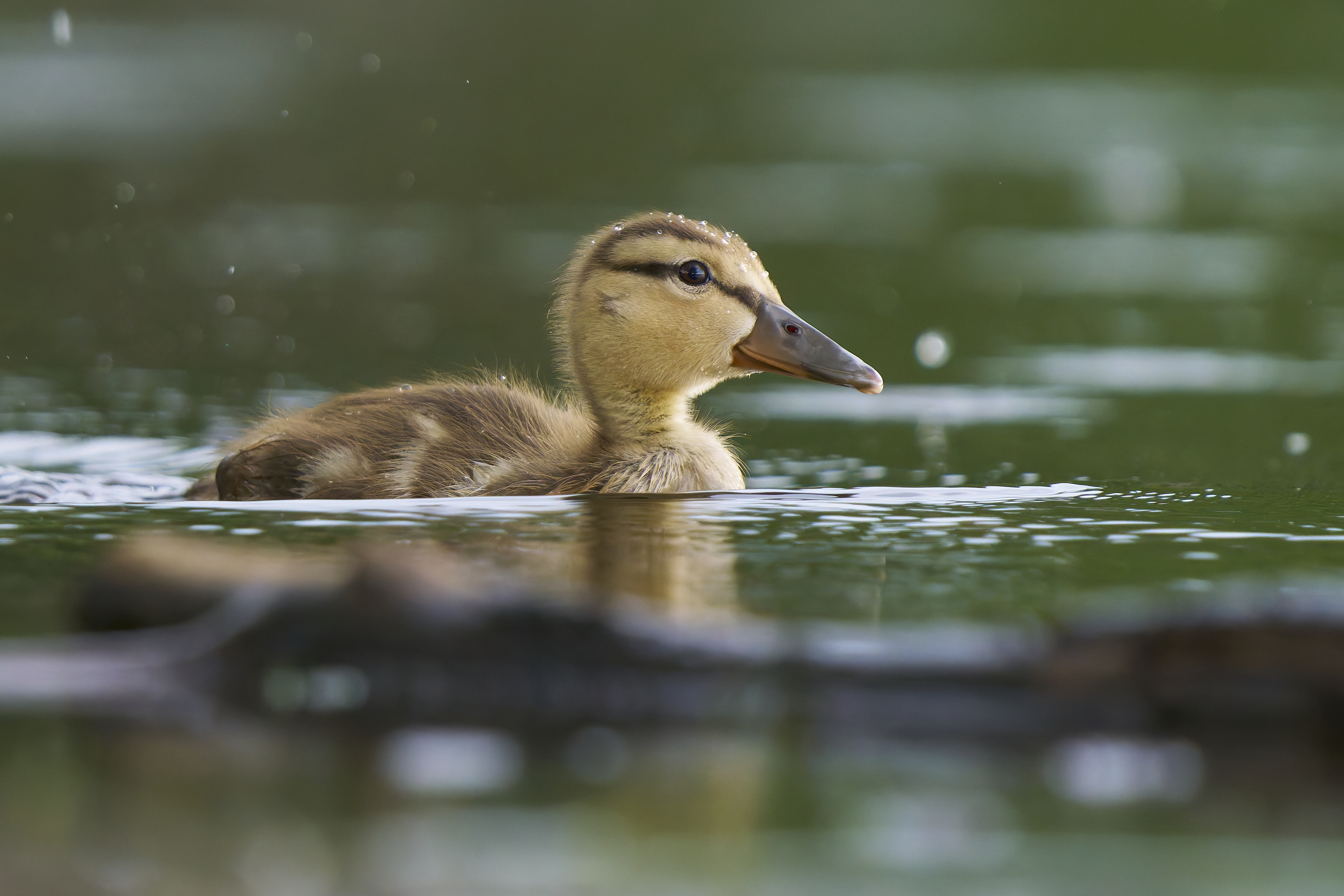
Swimming duckling

Female mallard with five ducklings

Egg clutches number 8–13 creamy white to greenish-buff eggs free of speckles. They measure about 58 mm (2.3 in) in length and 32 mm (1.3 in) in width. The eggs are laid on alternate days, and incubation begins when the clutch is almost complete. Incubation takes 27–28 days and fledging takes 50–60 days. The ducklings are precocial and fully capable of swimming as soon as they hatch. However, filial imprinting compels them to instinctively stay near the mother, not only for warmth and protection but also to learn about and remember their habitat as well as how and where to forage for food. Though adoptions are known to occur, female mallards typically do not tolerate stray ducklings near their broods, and will violently attack and drive away any unfamiliar young, sometimes going as far as to kill them.

When ducklings mature into flight-capable juveniles, they learn about and remember their traditional migratory routes (unless they are born and raised in captivity). In New Zealand, where mallards are naturalised, the nesting season has been found to be longer; eggs and clutches are larger and nest survival is generally greater compared with mallards in their native range.

In cases where a nest or brood fails, some mallards may mate for a second time in an attempt to raise a second clutch, typically around early-to-mid summer. In addition, mallards may occasionally breed during the autumn in cases of unseasonably warm weather; one such instance of a 'late' clutch occurred in November 2011, in which a female successfully hatched and raised a clutch of eleven ducklings at the London Wetland Centre. During the breeding season, both male and female mallards can become aggressive, driving off competitors to themselves or their mate by charging at them. Males tend to fight more than females and attack each other by repeatedly pecking at their rival's chest, ripping out feathers and even skin on rare occasions. Female mallards are also known to carry out 'inciting displays', which encourage other ducks in the flock to begin fighting. It is possible that this behaviour allows the female to evaluate the strength of potential partners.

The drakes that end up being left out after the others have paired off with mating partners sometimes target an isolated female duck, even one of a different species, and proceed to chase and peck at her until she weakens, at which point the males take turns copulating with the female. Lebret (1961) calls this behaviour "Attempted Rape Flight", and Stanley Cramp and K.E.L. Simmons (1977) speak of "rape-intent flights". Male mallards also occasionally chase other male ducks of a different species, and even each other, in the same way. In one documented case of "homosexual necrophilia", a male mallard copulated with another male he was chasing after the chased male died upon flying into a glass window. This paper was awarded an Ig Nobel Prize in 2003.

Mallards are opportunistically targeted by brood parasites, occasionally having eggs laid in their nests by redheads, ruddy ducks, lesser scaup, gadwalls, northern shovellers, northern pintails, cinnamon teal, common goldeneyes, and other mallards. These eggs are generally accepted when they resemble the eggs of the host mallard, but the hen may attempt to eject them or even abandon the nest if parasitism occurs during egg laying.

== Predators and threats ==
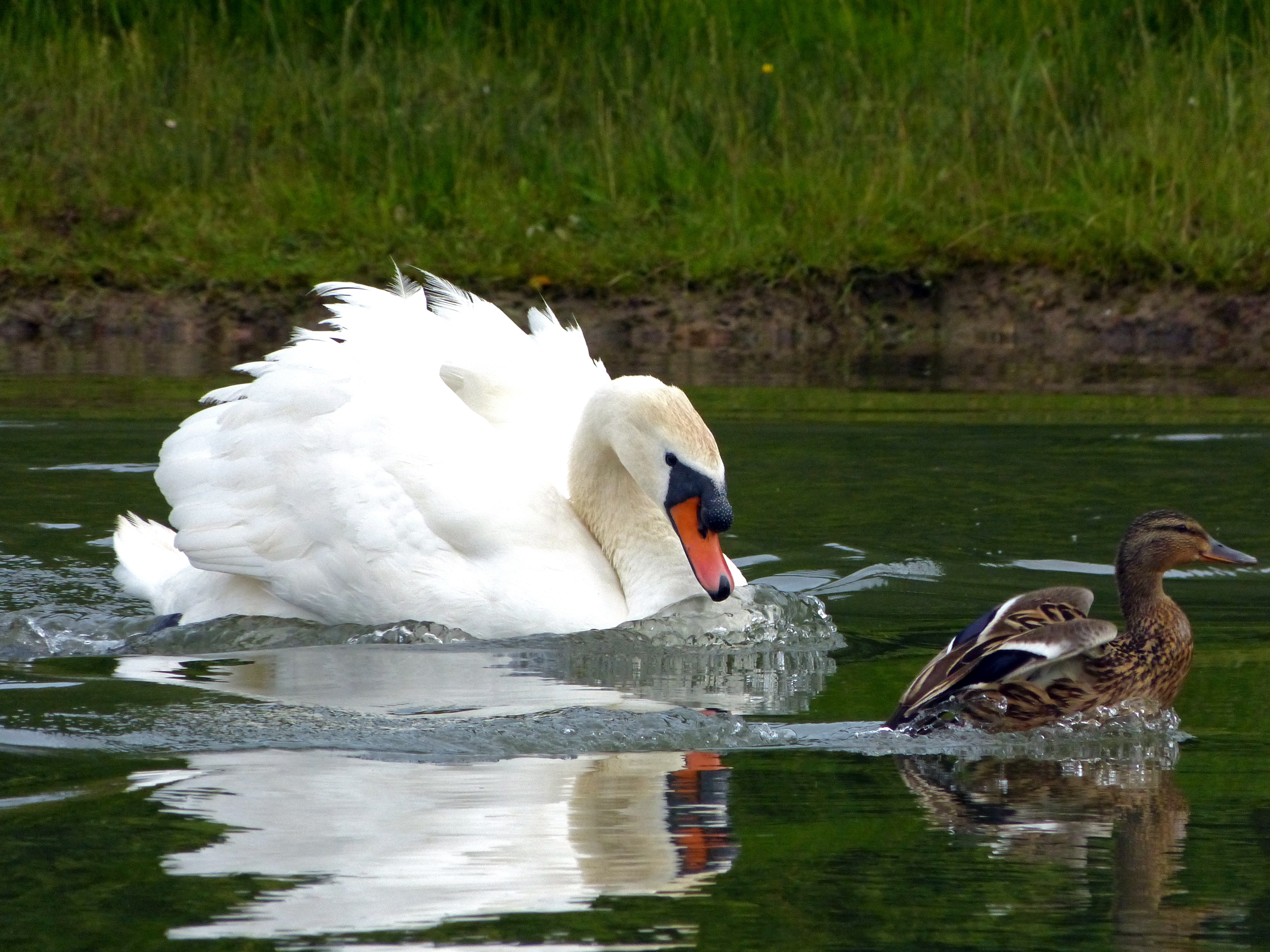
A male mute swan (Cygnus olor) driving off a female mallard.

In addition to human hunting, mallards of all ages (but especially young ones) and in all locations must contend with a wide diversity of predators including raptors and owls, mustelids, corvids, snakes, raccoons, opossums, skunks, turtles, large fish, felids, and canids, the last two including domestic cats and dogs. The most prolific natural predators of adult mallards are red foxes (Vulpes vulpes; which most often pick off brooding females) and the faster or larger birds of prey, (e.g. peregrine falcons, Aquila or Haliaeetus eagles). In North America, adult mallards face no fewer than 15 species of birds of prey, from northern harriers (Circus hudsonius) and short-eared owls (Asio flammeus) (both smaller than a mallard) to huge bald (Haliaeetus leucocephalus) and golden eagles (Aquila chrysaetos), and about a dozen species of mammalian predators, not counting several more avian and mammalian predators who threaten eggs and nestlings.

Mallards are also preyed upon by other waterside apex predators, such as grey herons (Ardea cinerea), great blue herons (Ardea herodias) and black-crowned night herons (Nycticorax nycticorax), the European herring gull (Larus argentatus), the wels catfish (Silurus glanis), and the northern pike (Esox lucius). Crows (Corvus spp.) are also known to kill ducklings and adults on occasion. Also, mallards may be attacked by larger anseriformes such as swans (Cygnus spp.) and geese during the breeding season, and are frequently driven off by these birds over territorial disputes. Mute swans (Cygnus olor) have been known to attack or even kill mallards if they feel that the ducks pose a threat to their offspring. Common loons (Gavia inmer) are similarly territorial and aggressive towards other birds in such disputes, and will frequently drive mallards away from their territory. However, in 2019, a pair of common loons in Wisconsin were observed raising a mallard duckling for several weeks, having seemingly adopted the bird after it had been abandoned by its parents.

In summer, a combination of hot temperatures and reduced water levels place mallards at an increased risk of contracting botulism, as these conditions are ideal for Clostridium botulinum to propagate, with the birds also more likely to come into contact with botulinum toxin produced by the bacteria. Outbreaks of botulism among mallard populations can lead to mass die-offs.

The predation-avoidance behaviour of sleeping with one eye open, allowing one brain hemisphere to remain aware while the other half sleeps, was first demonstrated in mallards, although it is believed to be widespread among birds in general.

== Status and conservation ==
Several drakes swimming in a pond

A mallard (male) eats rolled oats from the hand.

Since 1998, the mallard has been rated as a species of least concern on the IUCN Red List of Endangered Species. This is because it has a large range–more than 65,000,000 km^{2} (25,000,000 sq mi), though its very large population – estimated at more than 17 million mature individuals as of 2025 – is decreasing.

Unlike many waterfowl, mallards have benefited from human alterations to the world; so much so that they are now considered an invasive species in some regions. They are a common sight in urban parks, lakes, ponds, and other human-made water features in the regions they inhabit, and are often tolerated or encouraged in human habitat due to their placid nature towards humans, their ducklings and their beautiful and iridescent colours. While most are not domesticated, mallards are so successful at coexisting in human regions that the main conservation risk they pose comes from the loss of genetic diversity among a region's traditional ducks once humans and mallards colonise an area. Mallards are very adaptable, being able to live and even thrive in urban areas which may have supported more localised, sensitive species of waterfowl before development. The release of feral mallards in areas where they are not native sometimes creates problems through interbreeding with indigenous waterfowl. These non-migratory mallards interbreed with indigenous wild ducks from local populations of closely related species through genetic pollution by producing fertile offspring. Complete hybridisation of various species of wild duck gene pools could result in the extinction of many indigenous waterfowl. The mallard itself is the ancestor of most domestic ducks, and its naturally evolved wild gene pool gets genetically polluted in turn by the domestic and feral populations. Over time, a continuum of hybrids ranging between almost typical examples of either species develop; the speciation process is beginning to reverse itself. This has created conservation concerns for relatives of the mallard, such as the Hawaiian duck, the New Zealand grey duck (A. s. superciliosa) subspecies of the Pacific black duck, the American black duck, the mottled duck, Meller's duck, the yellow-billed duck, and the Mexican duck, in the latter case even leading to a dispute as to whether these birds should be considered a species (and thus entitled to more conservation research and funding) or included in the mallard species. Ecological changes and hunting have also led to a decline of local species; for example, the New Zealand grey duck population declined drastically due to overhunting in the mid-20th century. Hybrid offspring of Hawaiian ducks seem to be less well adapted to native habitat, and using them in re-introduction projects apparently reduces success. In summary, the problems of mallards "hybridising away" relatives is more a consequence of local ducks declining than of mallards spreading; allopatric speciation and isolating behaviour have produced today's diversity of mallard-like ducks despite the fact that, in most, if not all, of these populations, hybridisation must have occurred to some extent.

Mallard hybrids

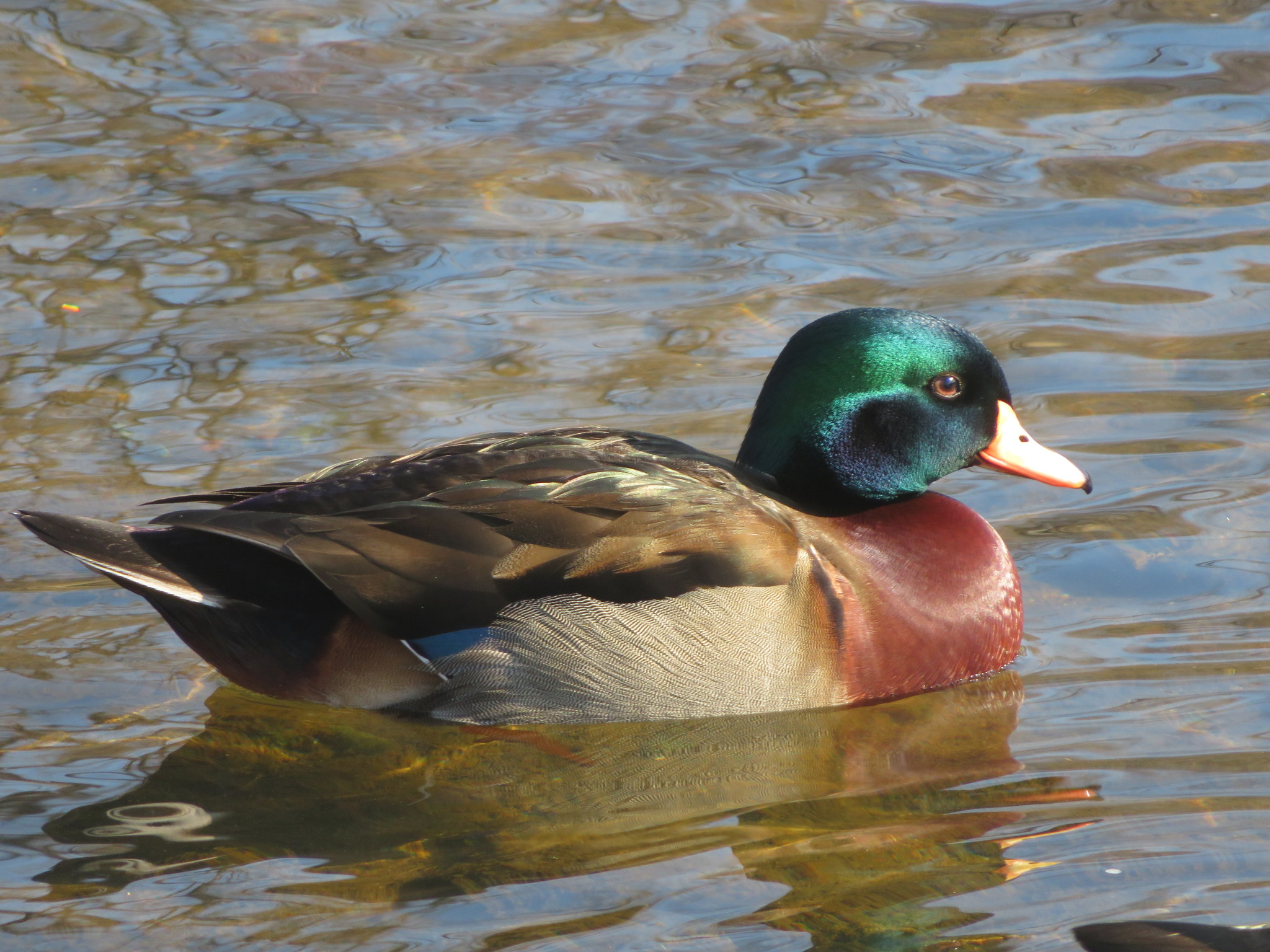
x Aix sponsa

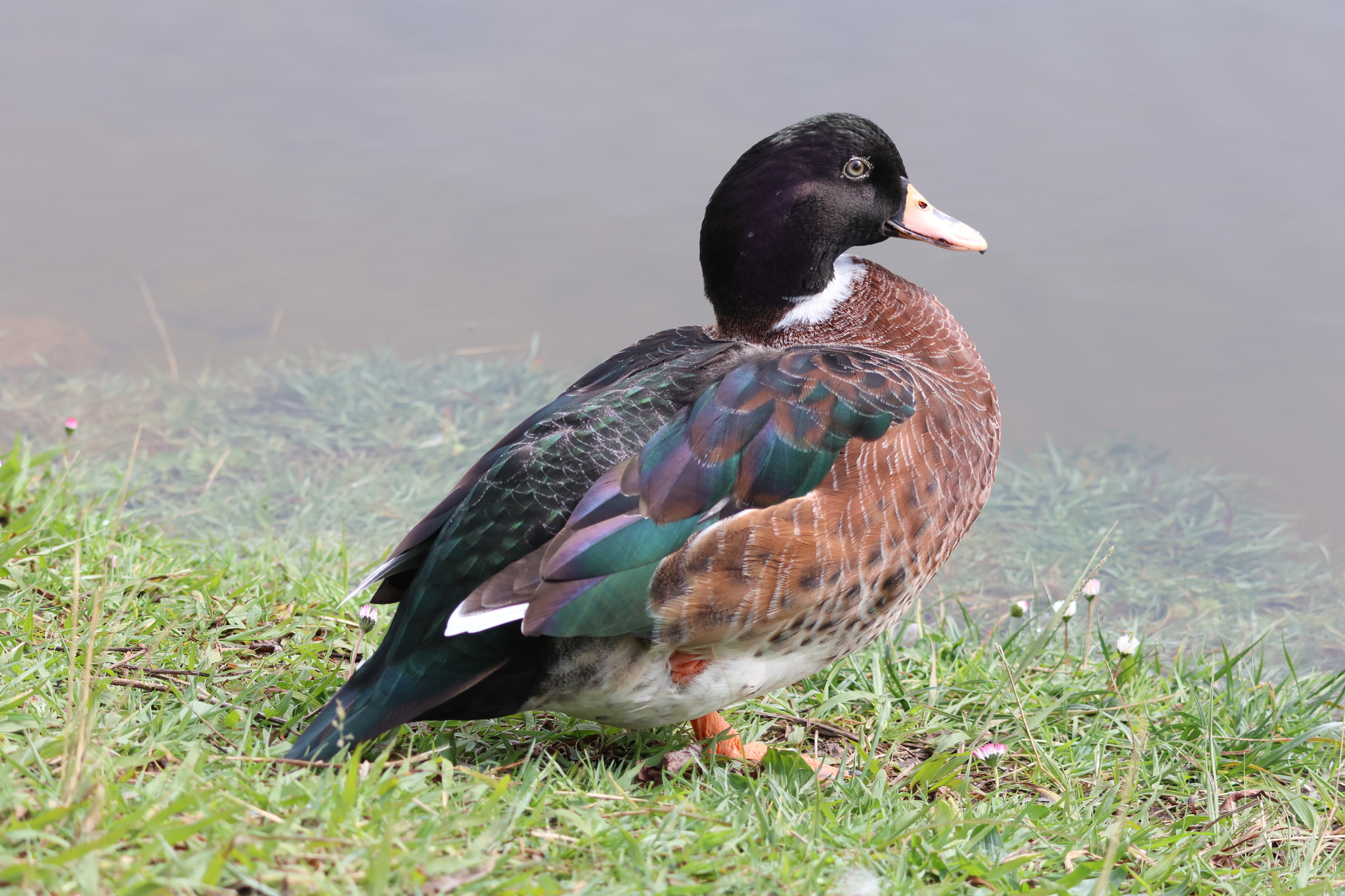
x Cairina moschata

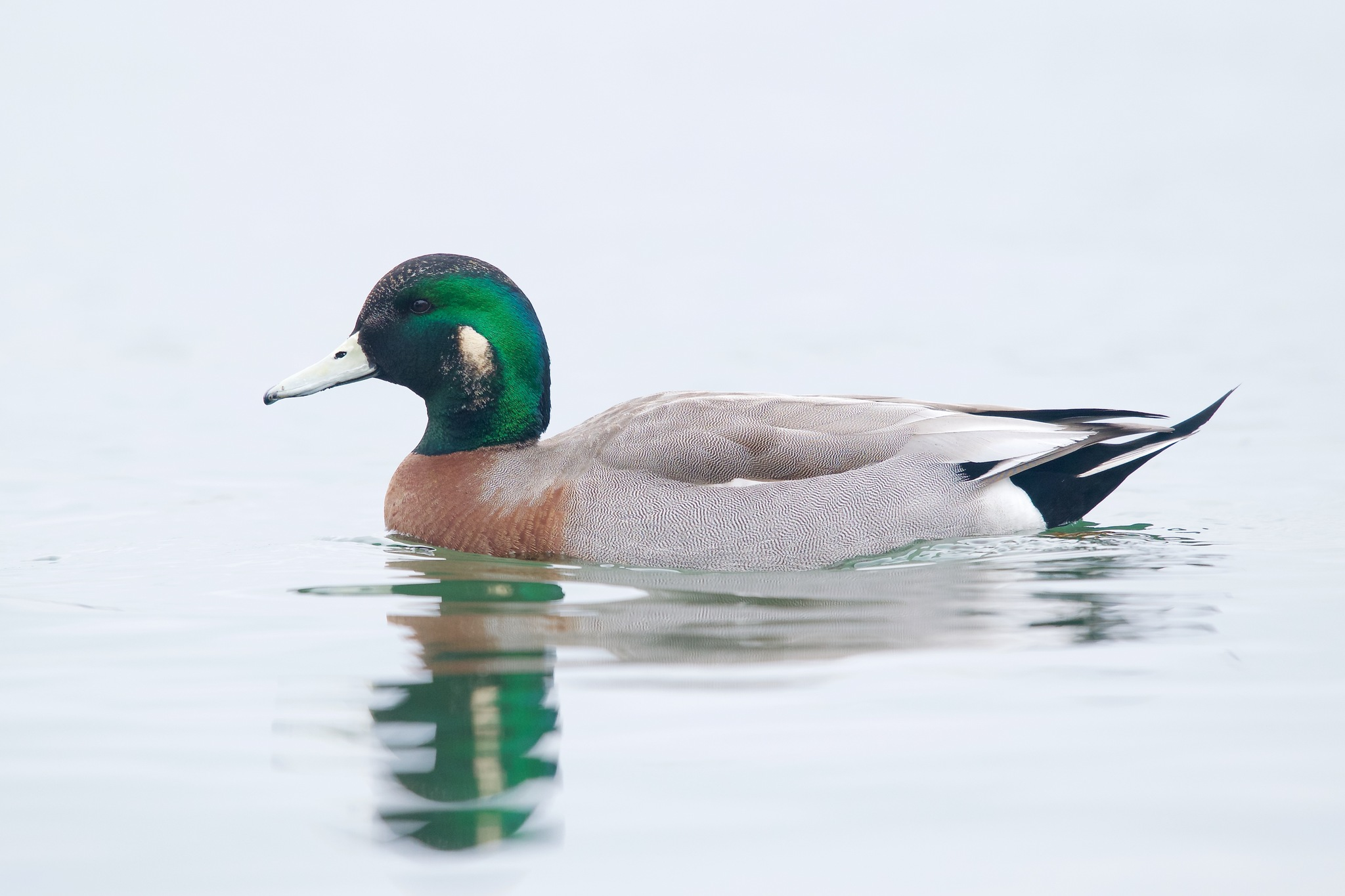
x Mareca americana

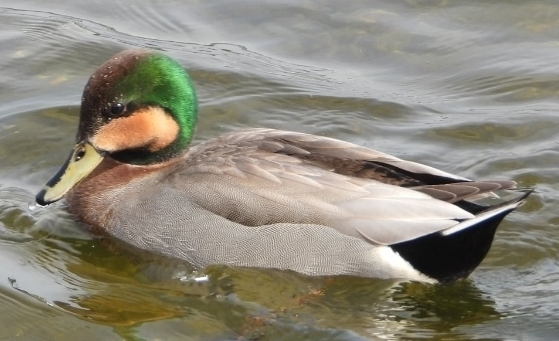
x Mareca strepera (Brewer's duck)

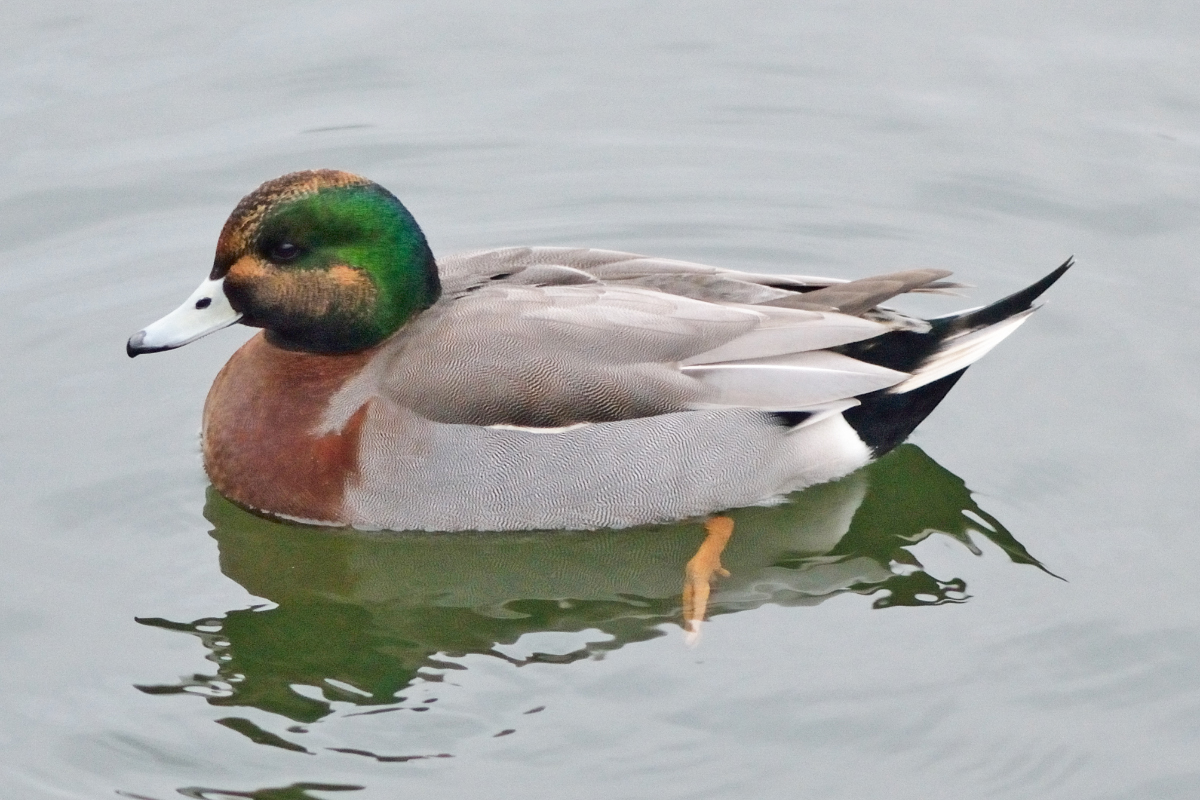
x Mareca penelope

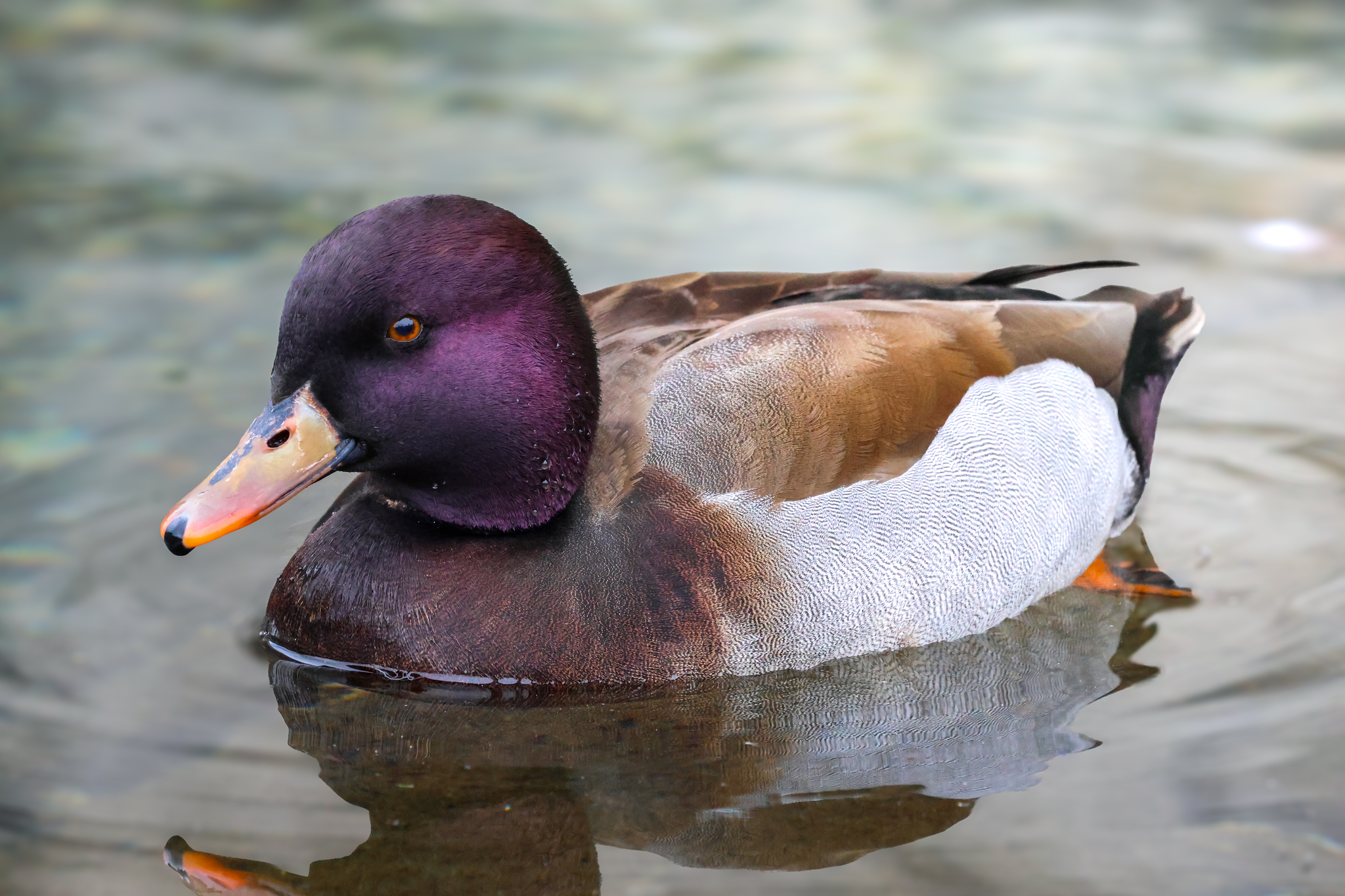
x Netta rufina

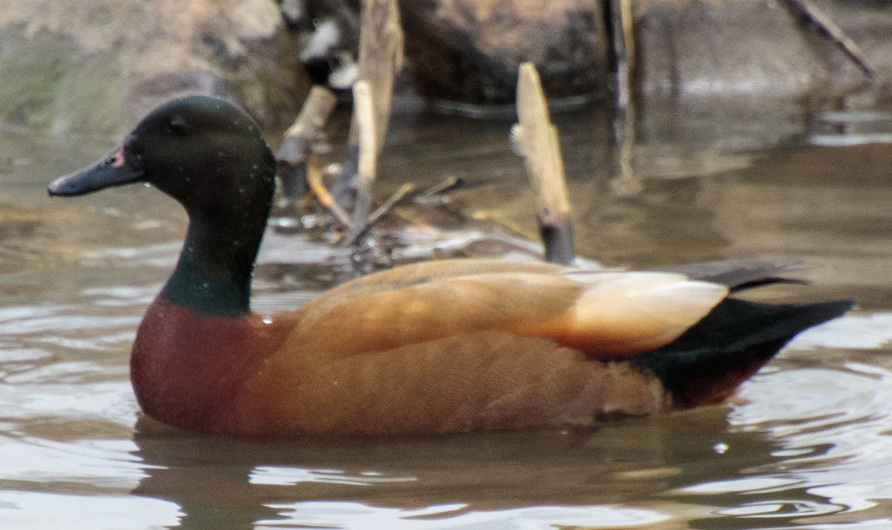
x Tadorna ferruginea

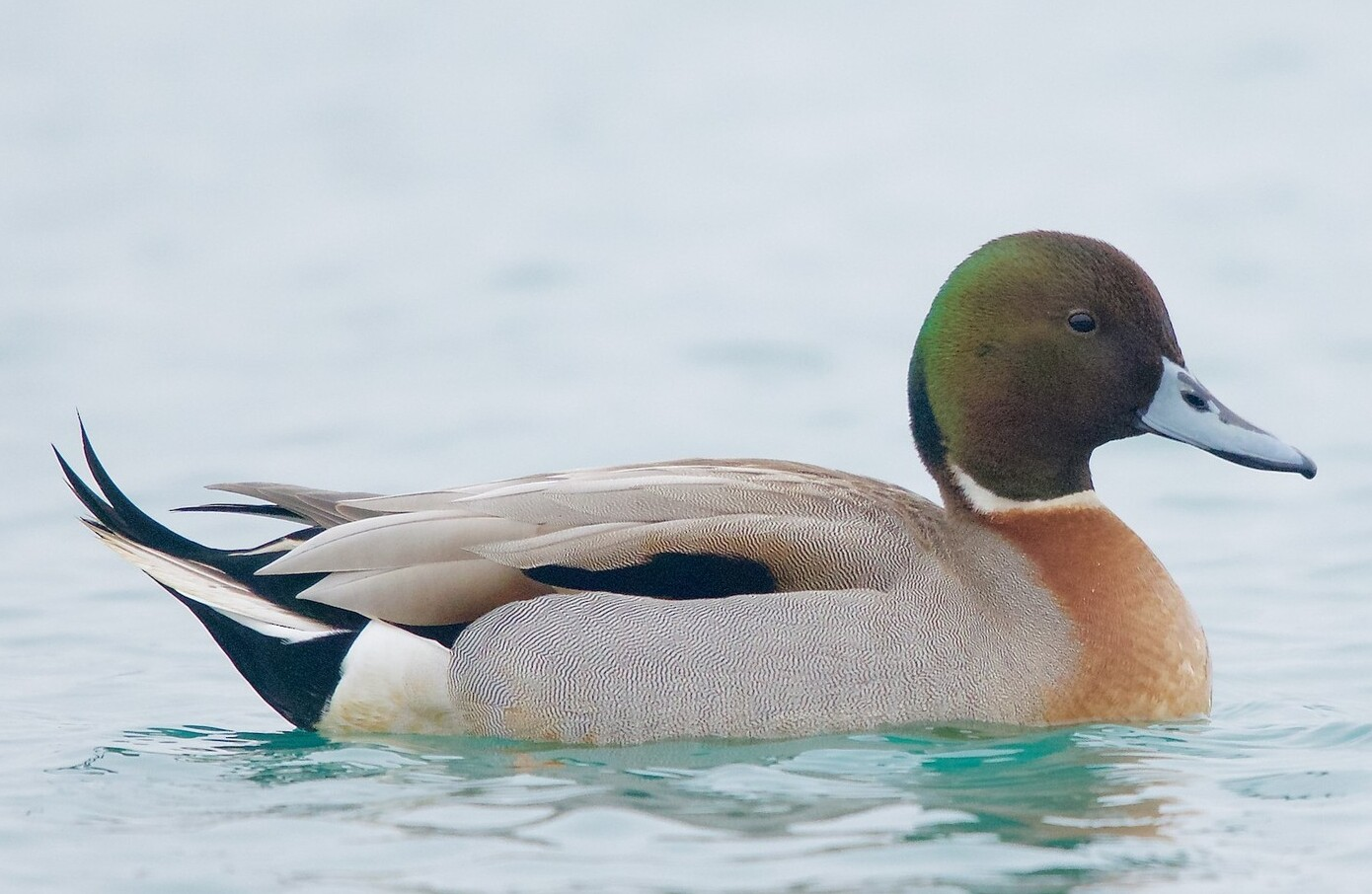
x A. acuta

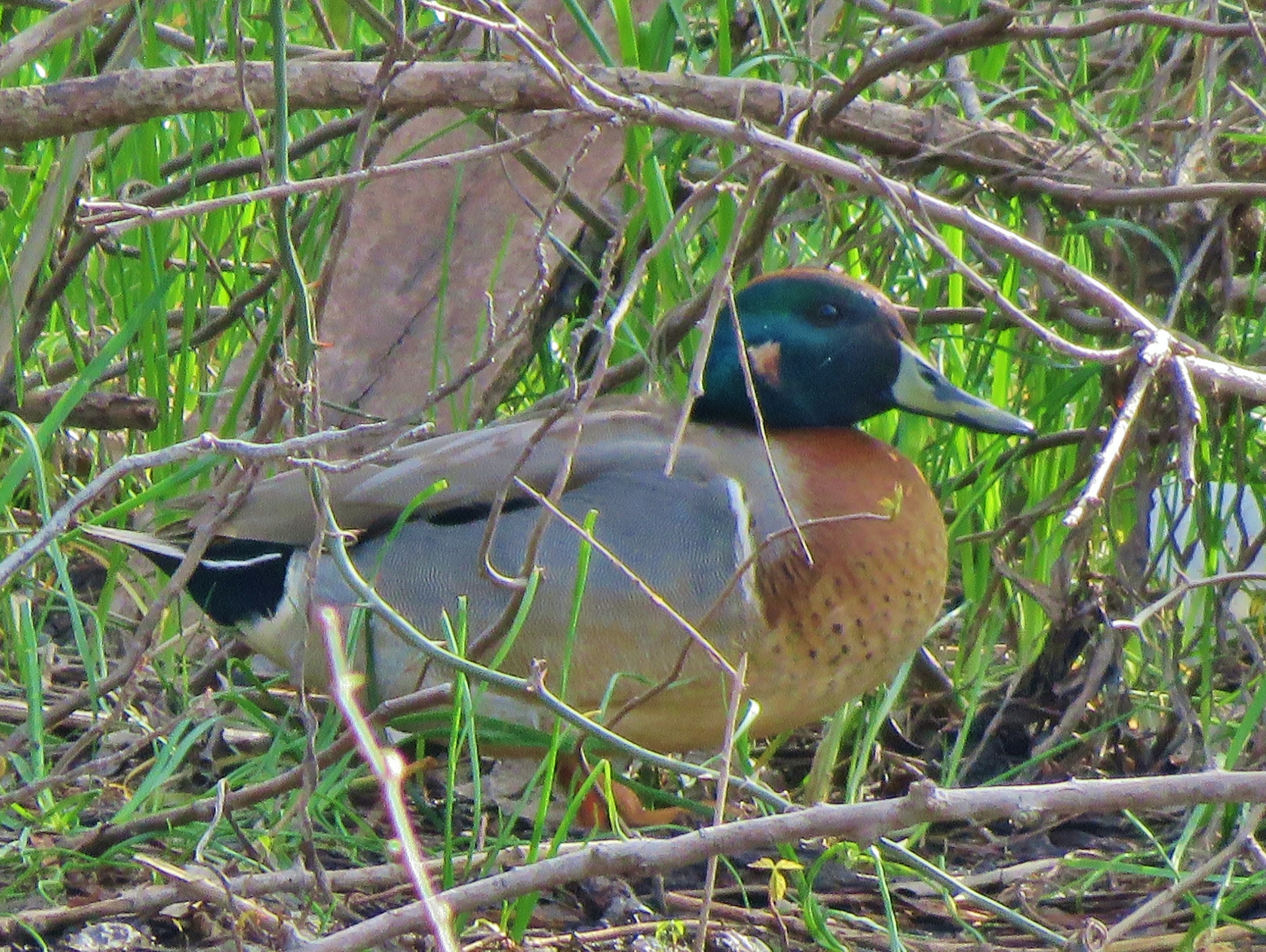
x A. carolinensis

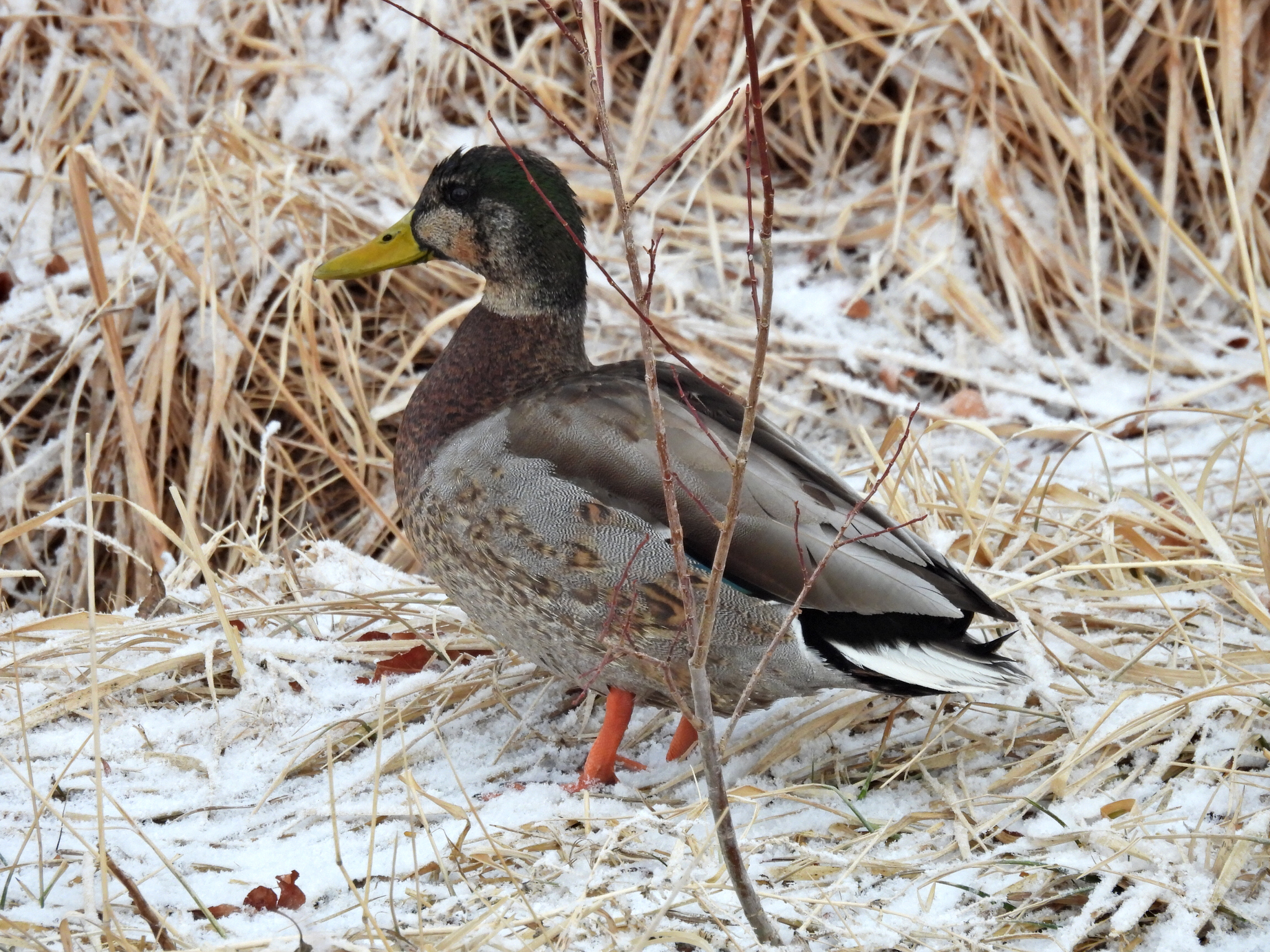
x A. diazi

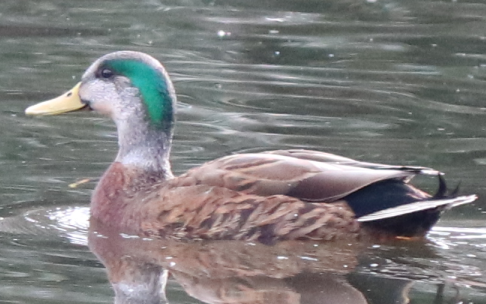
x A. fulvigula

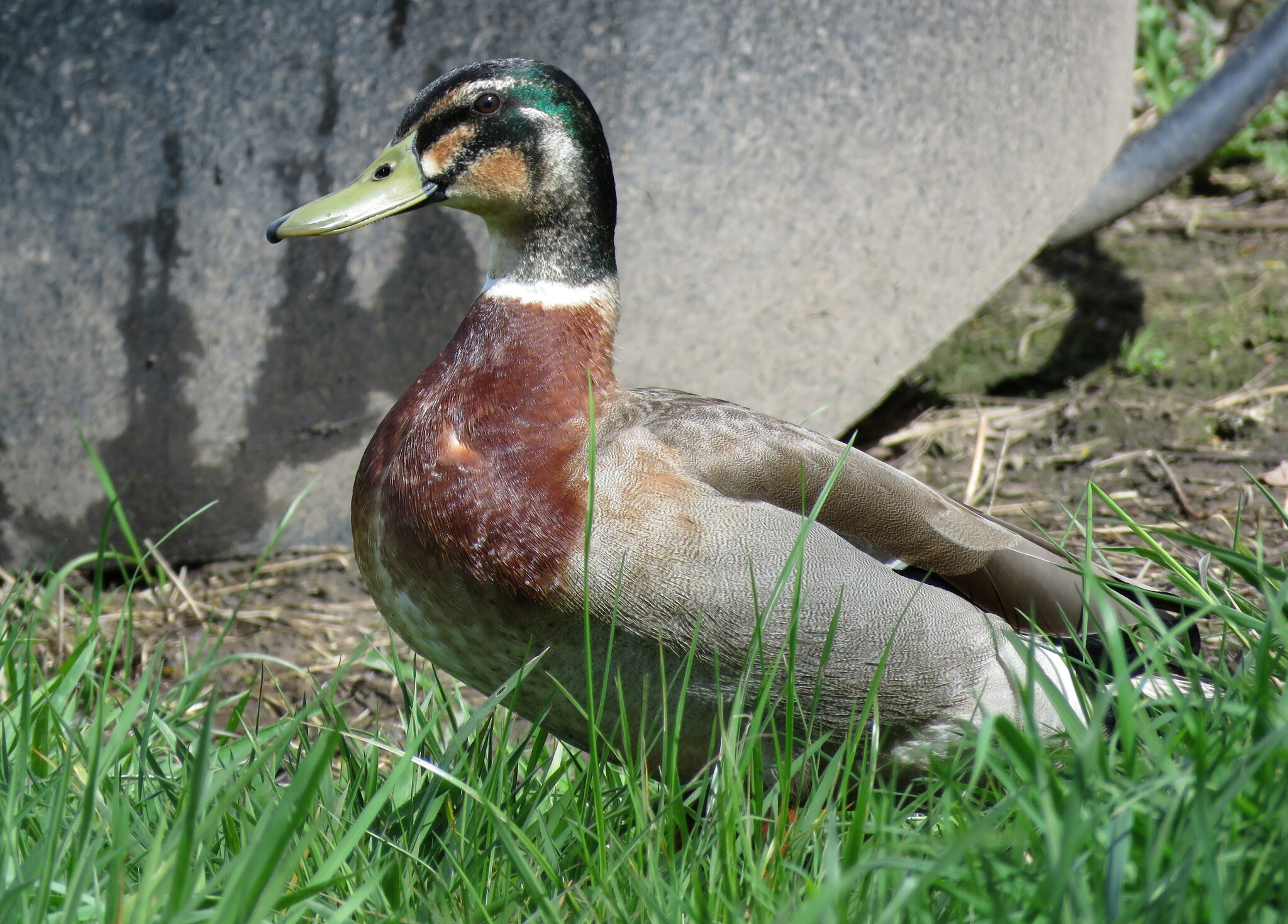
x A. superciliosa

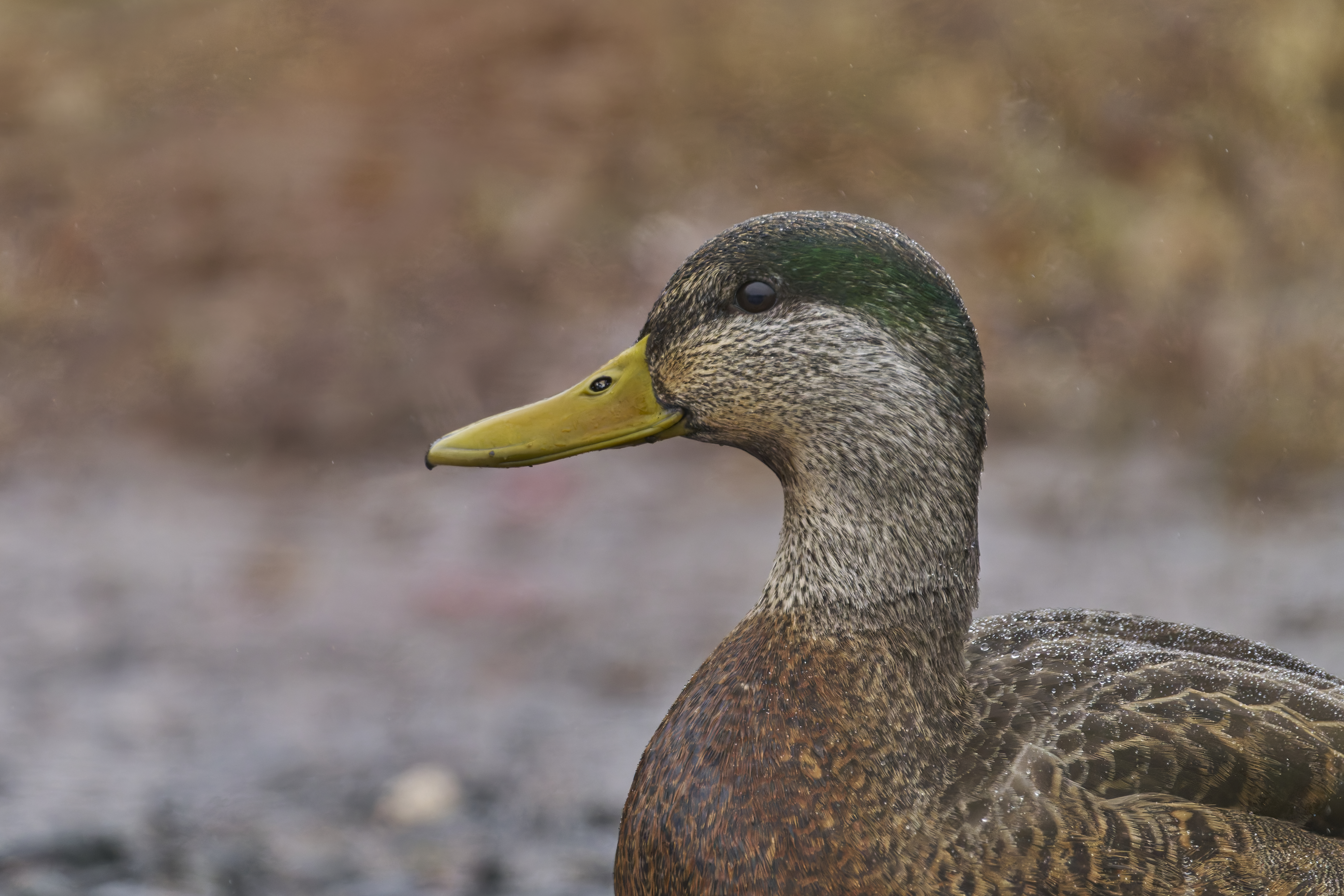
x A. rubripes

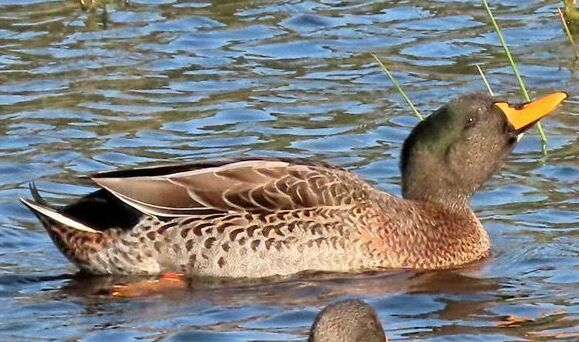
x A. undulata

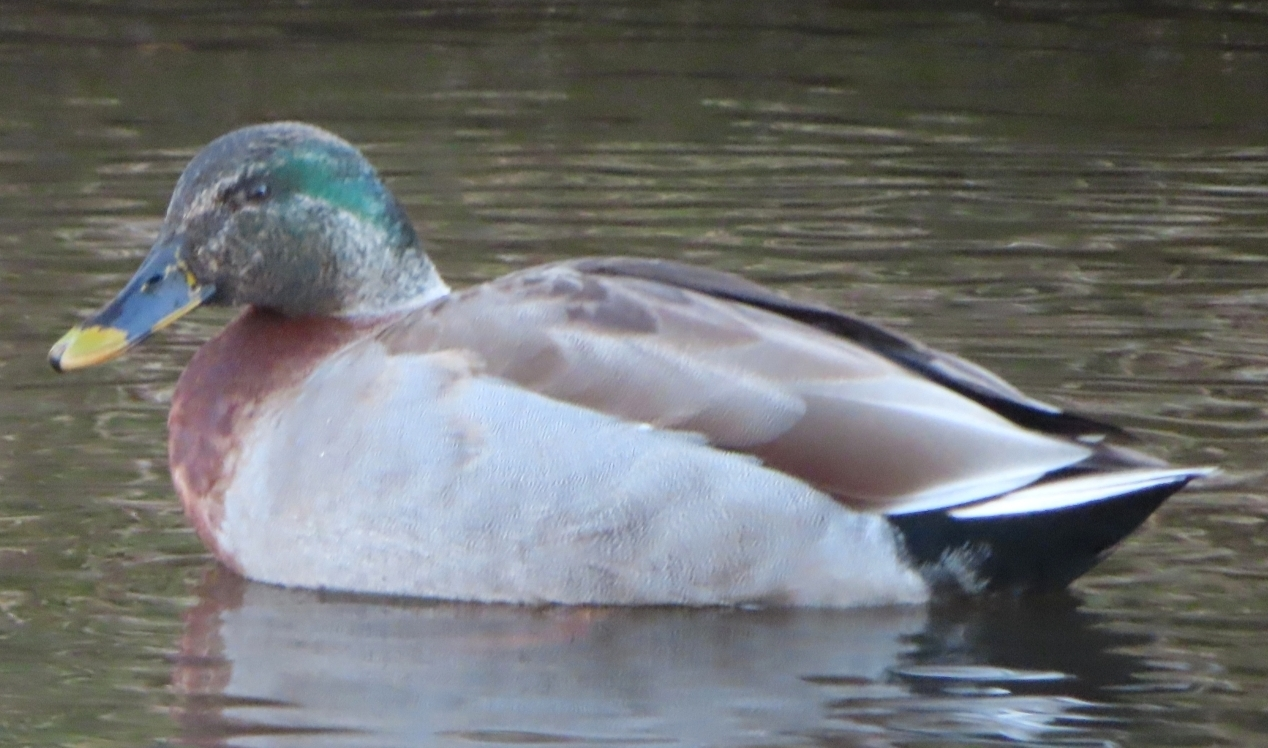
x A. zonorhyncha

=== Invasiveness ===
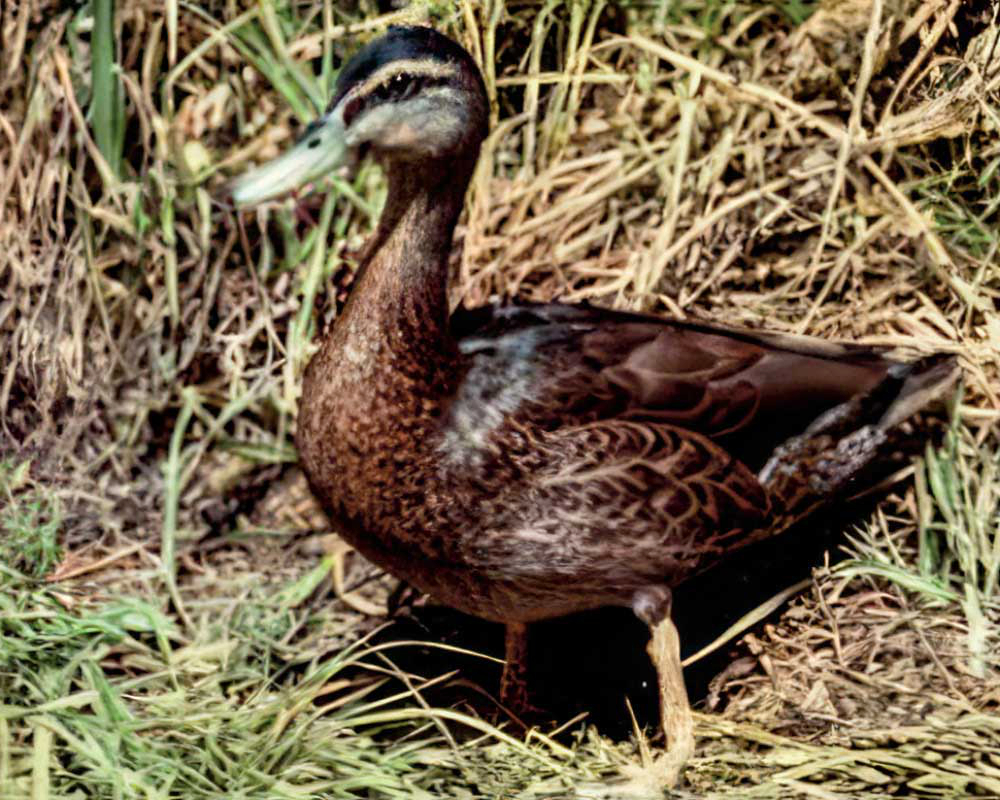
The last male Mariana mallard

Mallards are causing severe "genetic pollution" to South Africa's biodiversity by breeding with endemic ducks even though the Agreement on the Conservation of African-Eurasian Migratory Waterbirds – an agreement to protect the local waterfowl populations – applies to the mallard as well as other ducks. The hybrids of mallards and the yellow-billed duck are fertile, capable of producing hybrid offspring. If this continues, only hybrids occur and in the long term result in the extinction of various indigenous waterfowl. The mallard can crossbreed with 63 other species, posing a severe threat to indigenous waterfowl's genetic integrity. Mallards and their hybrids compete with indigenous birds for resources, including nest sites, roosting sites, and food. Availability of mallards, mallard ducklings, and fertilised mallard eggs for public sale and private ownership, either as poultry or as pets, is currently legal in the United States, except for the state of Florida, which has currently banned domestic ownership of mallards. This is to prevent hybridisation with the native mottled duck.

The mallard is considered an invasive species in Australia and New Zealand, where it competes with the Pacific black duck (known as the grey duck locally in New Zealand) which was over-hunted in the past. There, and elsewhere, mallards are spreading with increasing urbanisation and hybridising with local relatives.

The eastern or Chinese spot-billed duck is currently introgressing into the mallard populations of the Primorsky Krai, possibly due to habitat changes from global warming. The Mariana mallard was a resident allopatric population – in most respects a good species – apparently initially derived from mallard–Pacific black duck hybrids; it became extinct in the late 20th century.

The Laysan duck is an insular relative of the mallard, with a very small and fluctuating population. Mallards sometimes arrive on its island home during migration, and can be expected to occasionally have remained and hybridised with Laysan ducks as long as these species have existed. However, these hybrids are less well adapted to the peculiar ecological conditions of Laysan Island than the local ducks, and thus have lower fitness. Laysan ducks were found throughout the Hawaiian archipelago before 400 AD, after which they suffered a rapid decline during the Polynesian colonisation. Now, their range includes only Laysan Island. It is one of the successfully translocated birds, after having become nearly extinct in the early 20th century.

== Relationship with humans ==
=== Domestication ===
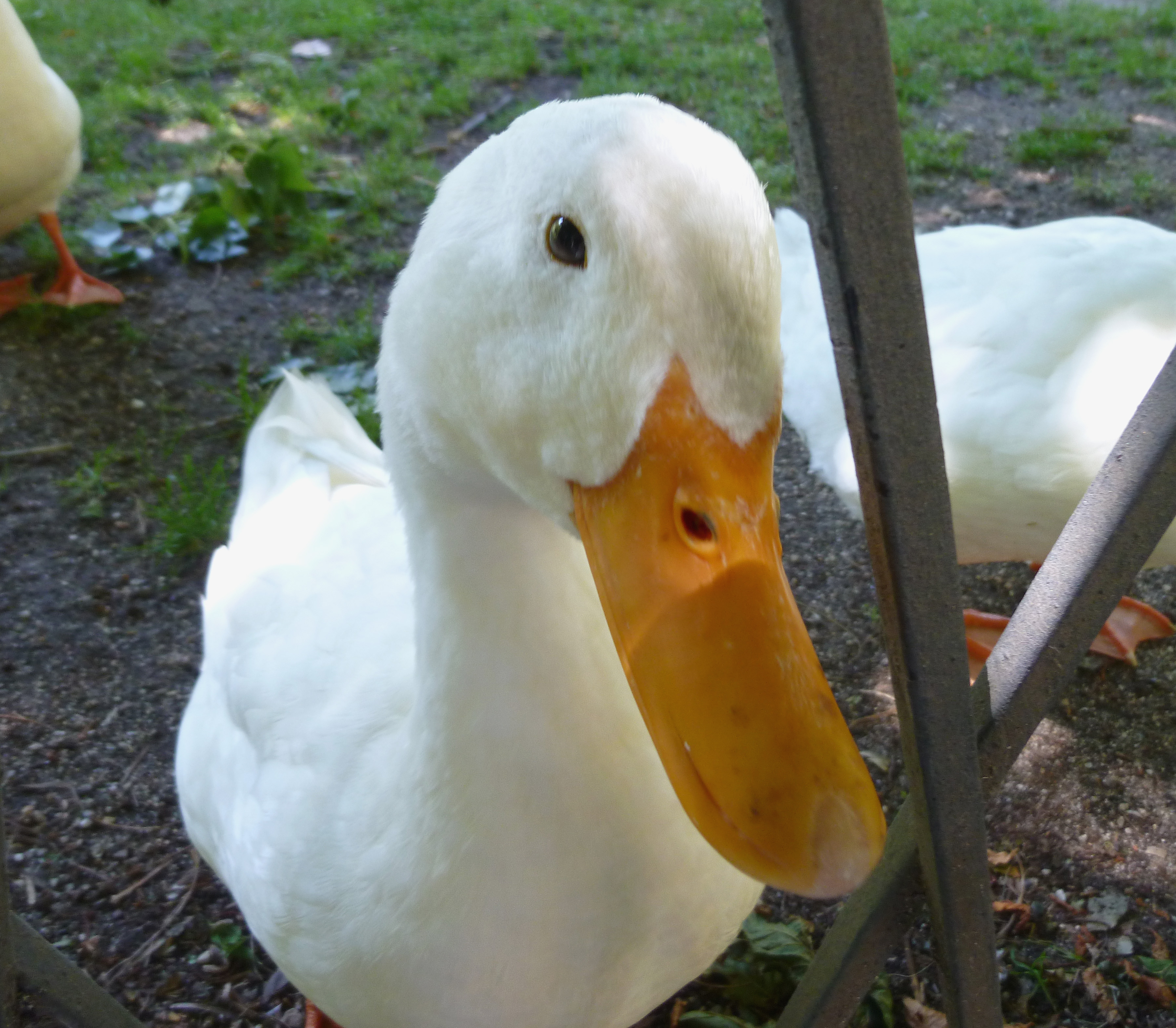
An American Pekin duck, a breed of domestic duck derived from the mallard

Mallards have often been ubiquitous in their regions among the ponds, rivers, and streams of human parks, farms, and other human-made waterways, even to the point of visiting water features in human courtyards.

Mallards have had a long relationship with humans. Almost all domestic duck breeds derive from the mallard, with the exception of a few Muscovy breeds, and are often listed under the trinomial name "A. p. domesticus", though this is not an accepted subspecies name. Mallards are generally monogamous while domestic ducks are mostly polygamous. Domestic ducks have no territorial behaviour and are less aggressive than mallards. Domestic ducks are mostly kept for meat; their eggs are also eaten, and may have a strong flavour. They were first domesticated in Southeast Asia at least 4,000 years ago, during the Neolithic Age, and were also farmed by the Romans in Europe, and the Malays in Asia. As the domestic duck and the mallard are the same species as each other, it is common for mallards to mate with domestic ducks and produce hybrid offspring that are fully fertile. Because of this, mallards have been found to contain genes of the domestic duck.

While the keeping of domestic breeds is more popular, pure-bred mallards are sometimes kept for eggs and meat, although they may require wing clipping to restrict flying.

=== Hunting ===
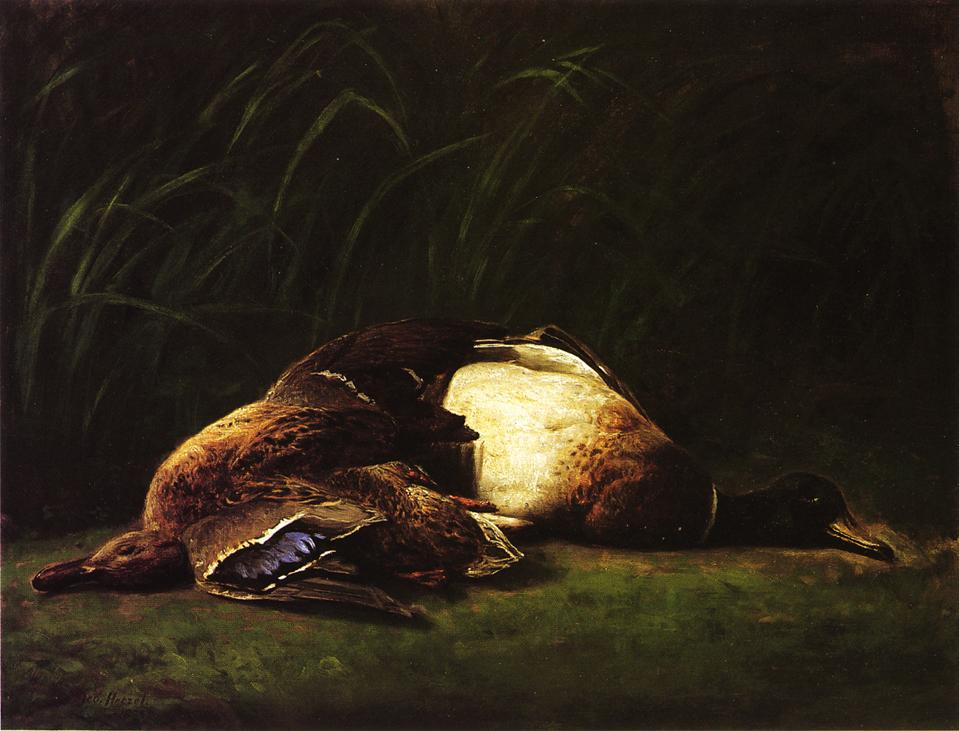
George Hetzel, painting of dead mallards, 1883–1884

Mallards are one of the most common species shot in waterfowl hunting due to their large population size. The ideal location for hunting mallards is considered to be where the water level is somewhat shallow where the birds can be found foraging for food. Hunting mallards might cause the population to decline in some places, at some times, and with some populations. In certain countries, the mallard may be legally shot but is protected under national acts and policies. For example, in the United Kingdom, the mallard is protected under the Wildlife and Countryside Act 1981, which restricts certain hunting methods or taking or killing mallards.

=== Mallard–vehicle collisions ===
Since standardised data collection began in 1990, the United States Federal Aviation Administration has recorded 1320 mallard collisions with aircraft, 261 of which caused damage to the craft (through 2022). In the United States, the mallard ranks as the 7th most hazardous bird to both military and commercial aircraft. Mallards are of particular concern due to their ubiquity; they are widespread and adaptable to urban environments. Mallards also generally fail to avoid approaching vehicles in experimental settings, especially at high vehicle speeds.

Though most bird strikes occur during the takeoff and landing phases of flight, at least one mallard has been struck at cruising altitude (6,400 m (21,000 ft)).

=== As food ===
The mallard has been eaten as food since ancient times, with evidence they were eaten in Neolithic Greece. Usually, only the breast and thigh meat is eaten. It does not need to be hung before preparation, and is often braised or roasted, sometimes flavoured with bitter orange or with port.

=== In culture ===
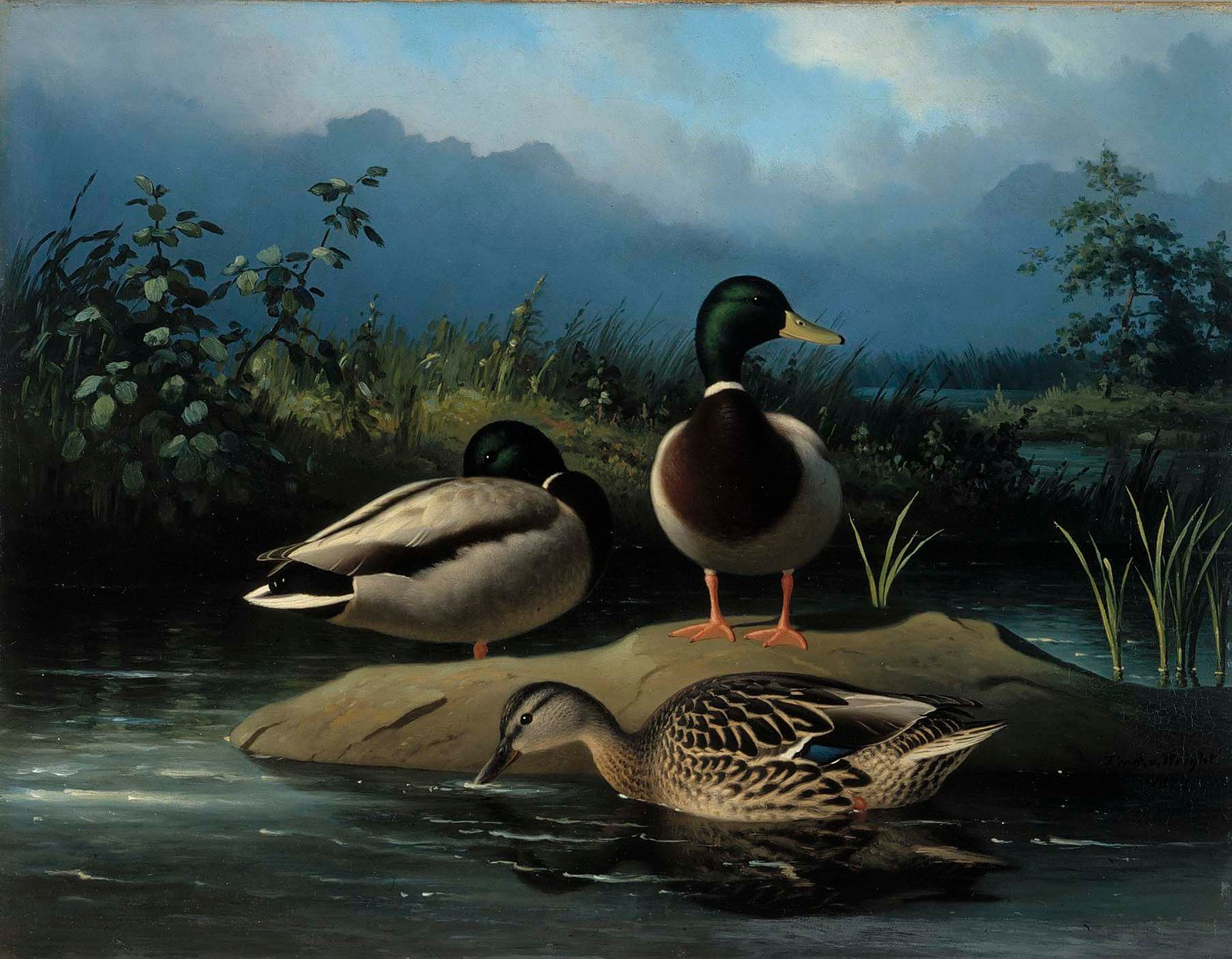
Mallards (1874) by Ferdinand von Wright

Make Way for Ducklings is a children's picture book written and illustrated by Robert McCloskey. The book centers on a pair of mallards who raise their ducklings in the Boston Public Garden.

Migration is an animated adventure comedy film produced by Universal Pictures and Illumination. The story follows a family of mallards that live in a pond in New England and go on vacation in Jamaica.

The world's loneliest duck, named "Trevor" by locals after New Zealand politician Trevor Mallard, appeared without explanation on the Pacific island of Niue, dying there in 2019.
