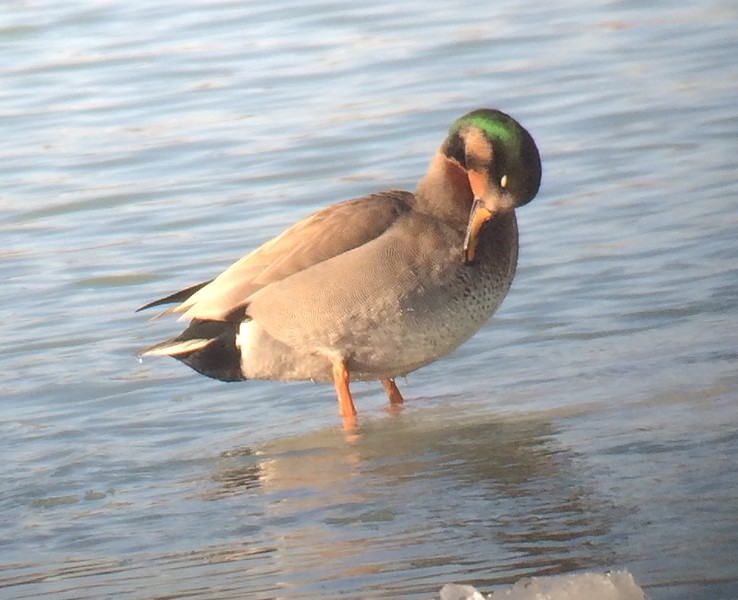

Scientific classification
- Kingdom: Animalia
- Phylum: Chordata
- Class: Aves
- Order: Anseriformes
- Family: Anatidae
- Subfamily: Anatinae
- Tribe: Anatini
- Hybrid: Anas platyrhynchos × Mareca strepera

= Brewer's duck =

Hybrid bird

Brewer's duck is an intergeneric hybrid between a mallard and a gadwall. John James Audubon painted a specimen, also referring to it as a Bemaculated Duck, a misspelling of "bimaculated".
