= Bovid hybrid =

Crossbreeds in the bovid family

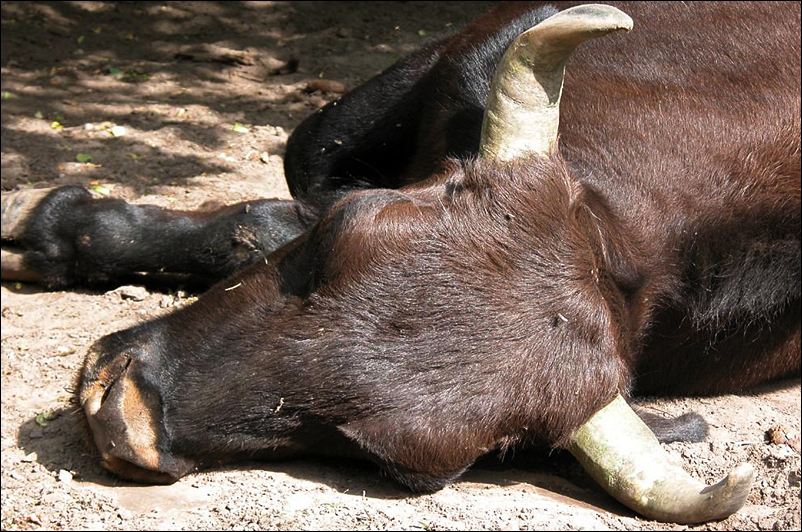
Żubroń are hybrids of domestic cattle and wisents.

A bovid hybrid is the hybrid offspring of members of two different species of the bovid family. There are 143 extant species of bovid, and the widespread domestication of several species has led to an interest in hybridisation for the purpose of encouraging traits useful to humans, and to preserve declining populations. Bovid hybrids may occur naturally through undirected interbreeding, traditional pastoral practices, or may be the result of modern interventions, sometimes bringing together species from different parts of the world.

== Bos hybrids ==
The following are examples of hybrids including species or sub-species in the Bos genus.

=== Hybrids between bison and domestic cattle ===
The American bison (Bison bison) and European bison (Bison bonasus) have been hybridized with domestic cattle (Bos taurus) to create both the Beefalo and Żubroń.

==== European bison ====
The wisent, or European bison, was originally crossed with cattle in an attempt to reinvigorate the declining wisent population. First generation hybrid males are sterile, but females may be crossed back to either a wisent or domestic bull to produce fertile males. Modern wisent herds keep hybrids well isolated from pure wisent. However, since the modern purebred wisent descend from fewer than two dozen individuals, a significant genetic bottleneck has resulted for the purebred wisent.

Wisent have also been crossed with domestic cattle to produce the żubroń. These were first bred in Poland in 1847 as hardy, disease resistant alternatives to domestic cattle. Breeding was discontinued in the 1980s. The few remaining żubroń can be found at Bialowieski National Park. Male żubroń are infertile, but the females are fertile.

==== American bison ====
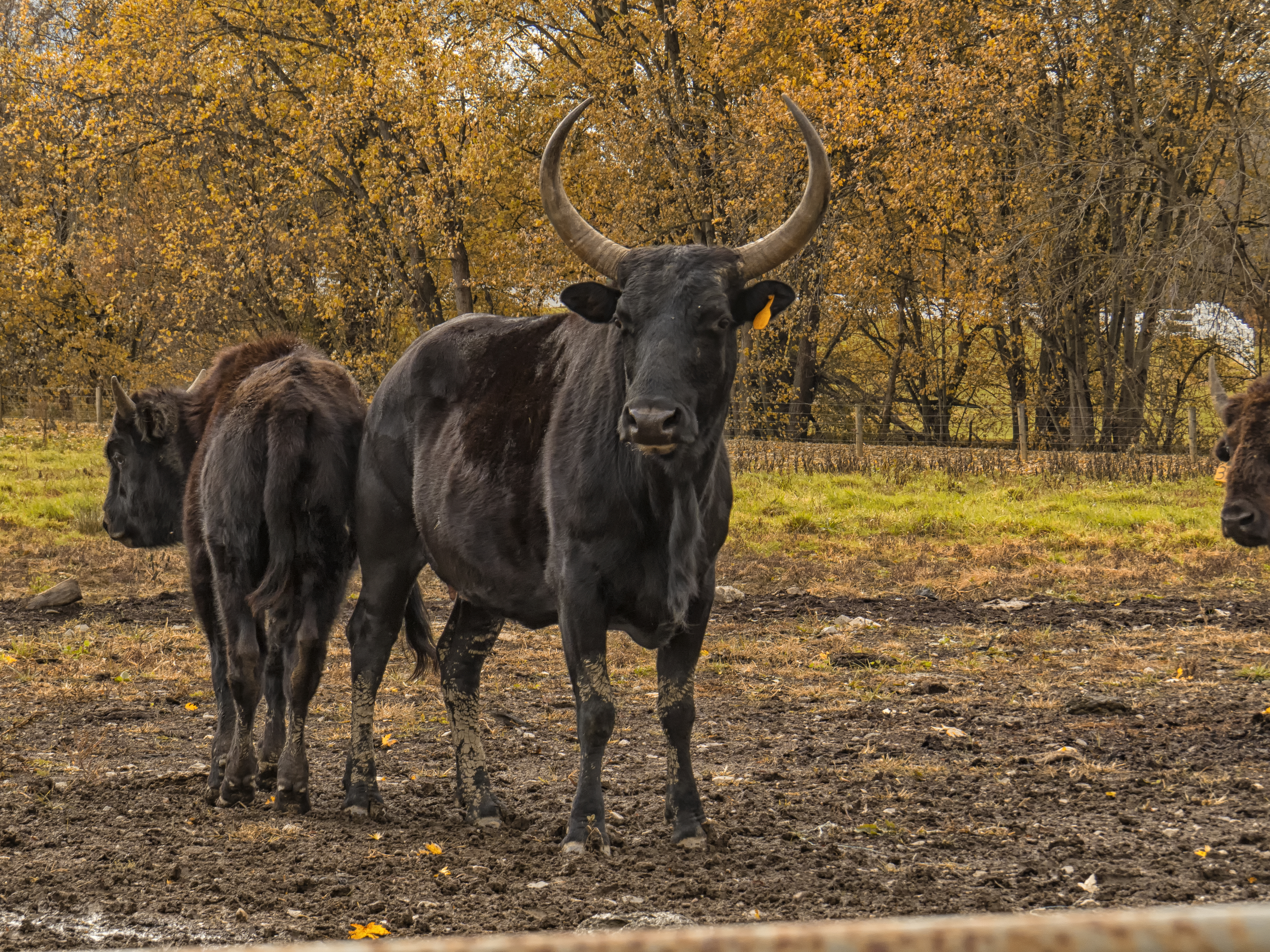
American "beefalo" mother and her 6 month old 1/4 cow, 3/4 American bison calf

American bison bulls (American "buffalo") have been crossed with domestic cattle to produce beefalo or cattalo. These are variable in type and colour, depending on the breed of cattle used e.g. Herefords and Charolais (beef cattle), Holsteins (dairy) or Brahmans (humped cattle). Generally, they are horned with heavy set forequarters, sloping backs, and lighter hindquarters. Beefalo have been back-crossed to bison and to domestic cattle; some of these resemble pied bison with smooth coats and a maned hump.

The aim of hybridisation is to produce high protein, low fat and low cholesterol beef on animals which have "less hump and more rump". Although bison bull-domestic cow crossings are more usual, domestic bull-bison cow crossings have a lower infant mortality rate (cow immune systems can reject hybrid calves). Modern beefalo include fertile bulls, making the beefalo a variety of "improved cattle". Bull and cow cattalos are reported in Wonders of Animal Life, edited by J. A. Hammerton (1930).

=== Hybrids between zebu and other Bos species ===
The zebu (Bos taurus indicus), is the common domestic cow in much of Asia. They have been interbred with other domestic cattle over thousands of years. Some zebu breeds are derived from hybrids between zebu and yak (Bos grunniens), gaur (Bos gaurus), and banteng (Bos javanicus). Zebu breeds have been widely crossed with European cattle. In Brazil, the Chanchim breed is 5/8 Charolais and 3/8 Zebu and combines the Charolais' meat quality and yield with the zebu's heat-resistance.

In The Variation of Animals and Plants Under Domestication, Charles Darwin wrote:

Bos primigenius and longifrons have been ranked by nearly all palaeontologists as distinct species; and it would not be reasonable to take a different view simply because their domesticated descendants now intercross with the utmost freedom. All the European breeds have so often been crossed both intentionally and unintentionally, that, if any sterility had ensued from such unions, it would certainly have been detected. ... The late Lord Powis imported some zebus and crossed them with common cattle in Shropshire; and I was assured by his steward that the cross-bred animals were perfectly fertile with both parent-stocks. Mr. Blyth informs me that in India hybrids, with various proportions of either blood, are quite fertile; and ... are allowed to breed freely together.

— Charles Darwin, The Variation of Animals and Plants Under Domestication, p. 84

The gayal (Bos frontalis), along with the Bali cattle, banteng and gaur, have also been bred with domestic cattle to produce hybrids.

Zebu have also been bred with Banteng to produce Madura cattle.

=== Hybrids between domestic cattle and yaks ===
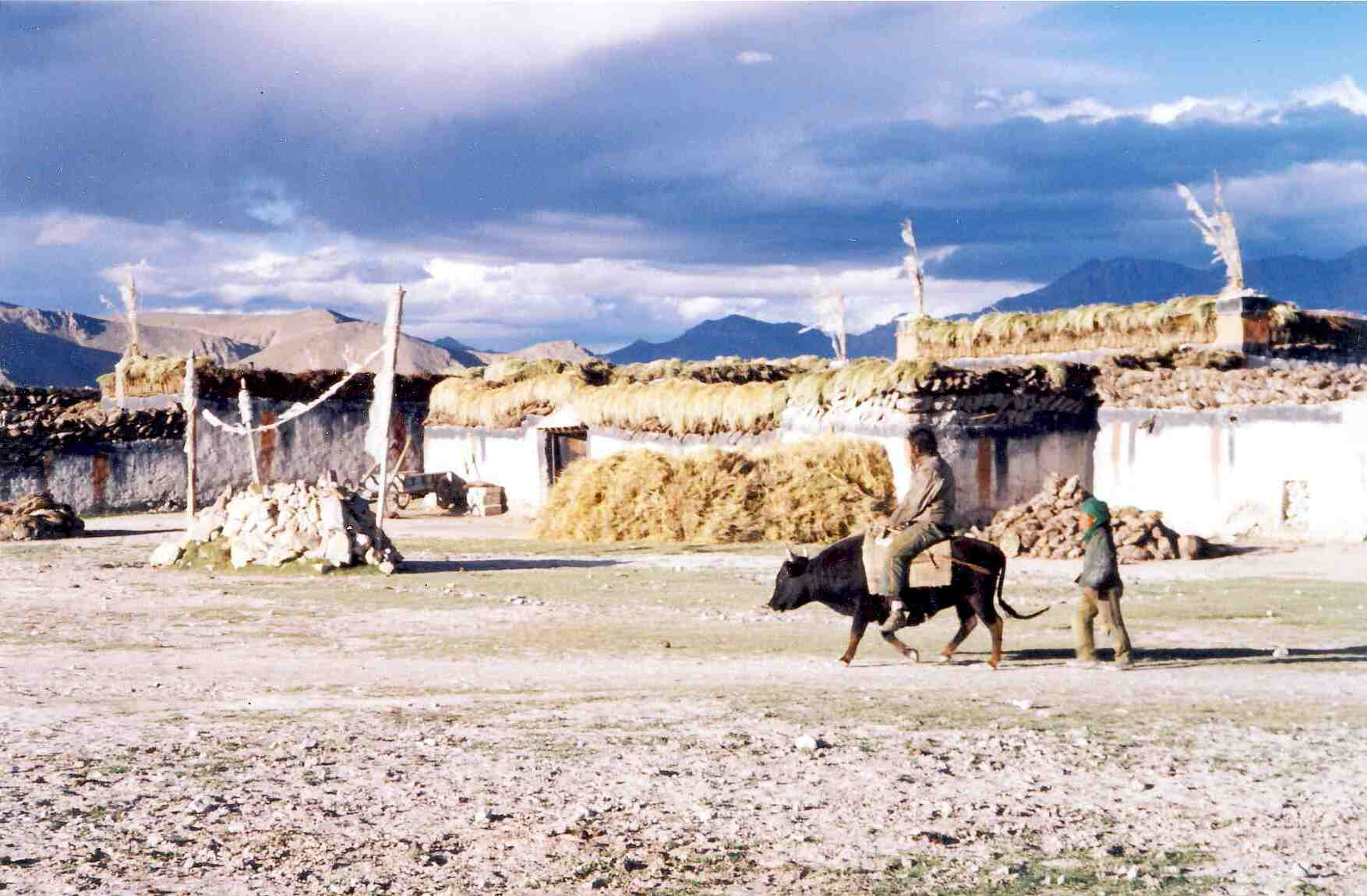
A dzo being ridden in Tibet

In India, Nepal, Tibet, and Mongolia, cattle are crossbred with yaks. This gives rise to the infertile male dzo, often used as oxen, as well as fertile females which are bred into cattle breeds and can serve as milk cows. The "Dwarf Lulu" breed of cattle was tested for DNA markers and found to be a mixture of both types of cattle with yak genetics.

=== Hybrids between bison and yaks ===
Yaks can also cross with bison. The hybrid offspring are occasionally kept by farmers in northern Alberta where the snowy, cold winters necessitate a cold-hardy animal. American bison has been bred with the domestic Tibetan yak to create the yakalo. Domestic yak bulls mated with bison cows produced fully fertile offspring. Male yak bred with beefalo produced fertile females and sterile males. The appearance of the yak × bison hybrid is strongly reminiscent morphologically to Bison latifrons.

== Hybrids between bison ==
=== Hybrids between species of bison ===
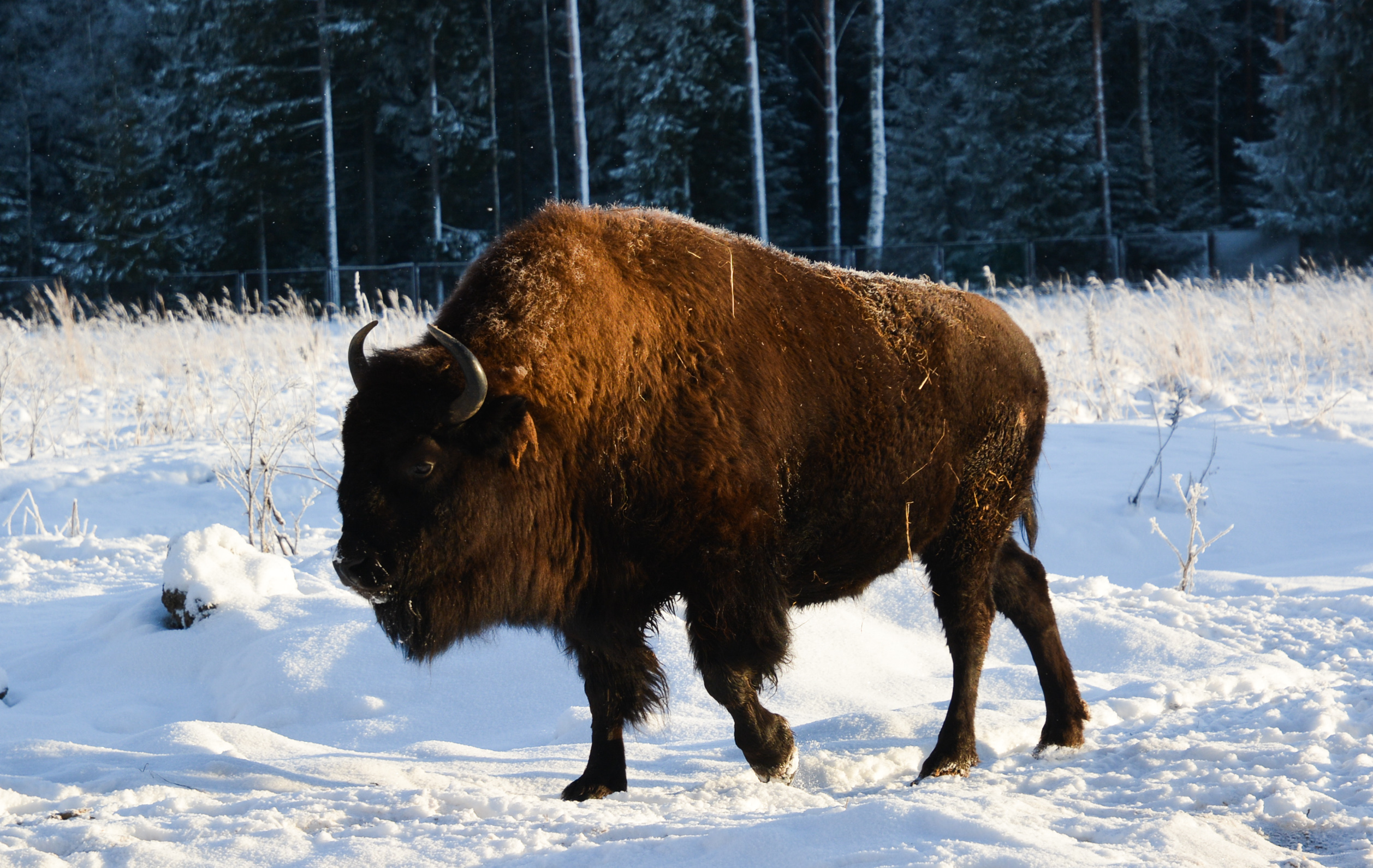
A hybrid between an American bison and European bison at Novo-Kavgolovsky Forest Park near Toksovo, Russia

In an attempt to revive the Caucasian wisent (Bison bonasus caucasicus), the American bisons and the European bisons were crossbred. Some have argued that these hybrids should be classified as a new subspecies Bison bonasus montanus.

=== Hybrids between subspecies of American bison ===
A herd of hybrid plains bison (Bison bison bison) × wood bison (Bison bison athabascae) lived wild in the Yukon, Canada. The wood bison is a distinct subspecies that almost became extinct in the 20th century. In an attempt to save the plains bison subspecies, between 1925 and 1928, thousands of plains bison were released into Wood Buffalo Park, a preserve for the wood bison subspecies. They readily interbred and produced a 12,000 strong herd by 1934.

A small genetically pure herd was recovered from an isolated area in 1959 and is now being kept isolated from introduced plains bison. Genetic testing seems to indicate that these wood bison are themselves hybridized with the plains subspecies, though their genetic makeup remains predominantly that of the wood bison.

== Water buffalo-domestic cattle hybrids ==
Water buffalo and domestic cattle are not known to be able to hybridize. In laboratory experiments, the embryos fail around the 8-cell stage.

There were suggestions of crossing the beefalo (an American bison-domestic cattle hybrid) to Cape buffalo, although this idea essentially ended when the Cape buffalo was found to have 52 chromosomes (instead of 60 as in cattle and bison), meaning that the hybrid's success would be unlikely.

== Hybrids between buffalo ==
Wild water buffalo (Bubalus arnee) and Domestic water buffalo (Bubalus bubalis) can interbreed freely and these may be a single species differentiated only by domestication.

The African buffalo (Syncerus caffer) subspecies, the Lake Chad buffalo (Syncerus caffer brachyceros) x African forest buffalo (Syncerus caffer nanus) can interbreed. The main difference between these buffalo is preferred habitat. Hybrid zones occur on forest/savannah margins.

== Hybrids between yaks ==
Wild yaks (Bos mutus) and domestic yaks (Bos grunniens) can readily interbreed, leading to the creation of hybrid populations, with no major reproductive barriers between wild and domestic yaks, allowing for easy mating, with wild yaks frequently visiting domestic yak herds to mate. This continuous admixture, while posing a threat to the genetic diversity of wild yaks, also provides adaptive advantages for yak herders, who may utilize the hybrid traits The mixture of wild and domestic yak genes can lead to beneficial traits for herders, such as increased hardiness or adaptation to specific environments

== Hybrids between wild and domestic goats ==
Goat hybrids can do occur, such as the Alpine ibex (Capra ibex), Wild goat (Capra aegagrus), and the domestic goat (Capra hircus) especially where their ranges overlap, and domestic goats become feral, with the horn shape, body size and coat patterns often being intermediate between the parent species.

== Hybrids between goats and sheep ==
Goats (Capra hircus) and sheep (Ovis aires) are closely related and can interbreed, they belong to different genera, with sheep having 54 chromosomes and goats having 60 chromosomes, as hybrid offspring are generally infertile and can result in a stillbirth. Despite widespread shared pasturing of goats and sheep, these hybrids are very rare, demonstrating the genetic distance between the two species. They are not to be confused with sheep–goat chimera, which are artificially created by combining the embryos of a goat and a sheep.

Hybrids between Barbary sheep (Ammotragus lervia) and domestic goats have also been produced. Hybridization of Barbary sheep and goats have produced live, fertile female hybrids (often with 57 chromosomes), and these hybrids can even backcross with rams.

== Hybrids between mouflon and sheep ==
Mouflon (Ovis gmelini) and sheep (Ovis aires) are known to hybridize with each other. These hybrids, often referred to as Corsican sheep in Texas, can display a range of characteristics, including coat color, tail length, and horn size that are intermediate between the two parent species.

== Hybrids between antelopes and gazelles ==
Natural or captive hybrids between certain species of antelope and gazelle in the genera Antilope and Gazella species have been documented, such as the blackbuck (Antilope cervicapra) with goitered gazelle (Gazella dorcas).

Historical records from the Marseilles Zoo indicate that several hybrids were bred in 1862. These offspring, including two males and one female, reached adulthood and were described as being intermediate in appearance between the parent species.

Hybridization between different antelope species can occur in captivity, often due to a lack of available mates, and is one indicator of how closely related some species are within the same subfamily or genus. Blackbucks are native to the Indian subcontinent, while dorcas gazelles are found in North Africa and the Arabian peninsula. Their geographically distinct natural habitats typically prevent them from interbreeding in the wild. Other fertile hybrids of antelope, such as the bongos (Tragelaphus eurycerus) and sitatungas (Tragelaphus spekii) have also occurred in captivity.

== Bovine-equine hybrid (folklore) ==
The Jumart or jumerre is a rumored hybrid between a bovine and a horse or donkey. Reports of jumarts were common in France in the 1700s and 1800s with several prominent French naturalists publishing accounts such animals.

Such hybridization is now known to be biologically impossible, since they are from widely different orders (cattle are Artiodactyls along with deer, giraffe and antelope, whilst Horses and Donkeys are Perissodactyls along with Rhinoceroses and Tapirs). Many of the supposed jumarts are thought to have been hinnies (hybrid offspring of male horses and female donkeys) or equines with achondroplasia.

== Genetic testing for hybrids ==
=== Genetic testing of public herds ===
Mitochondrial DNA testing of the Custer State Park herd have shown that 6% of the animals have bovine DNA traits and Dr. Derr from Texas A&M University, who led a study into bison genetics, conceded that the ‘hybrid’ animals tested were at least 15-20 generations from the original base stock and those animals contained only 0.003% bovine DNA. This herd was started in 1901 with a relatively small number of animals (<30). At the time, all these animals were believed to be pure through analysis of the physical phenotype but at least one animal with some bovine DNA must have been included in the original herd. Since the herd was formed, no new animals have been introduced and in this closed genetic pool, bovine DNA influences have not exceeded 6%, despite numerous generations of animals having passed. It is not yet known why this bovine DNA has not influenced a greater proportion of the herd nor a higher percentage of bovine DNA having survived, but one theory is that pure-bred animals with bovine influence do not grow to be as competitive as full-blood animals and are less likely to become dominant herd bulls. Therefore, the hybrid animals bulls are less likely to reproduce in the wild than pure animals, limiting the spread of bovine DNA within the herd.

Not all public herds in the US and Canada have been tested for bovine DNA, but the Elk Island Plains Bison Herd in Canada has been tested as pure. Other public herds that are believed to be pure include the Yellowstone Park Bison Herd, the Henry Mountains Bison Herd and the Wind Cave Bison Herd.

=== Genetic testing of private herds ===
Since DNA testing for purity has become available, there is a growing movement among bison ranchers to test their herds and cull animals that test positive for bovine DNA. The largest private herd in the world, with over 50,000 animals, is currently undergoing such a program. As similar programs gather momentum among smaller private herds, the level of hybridization among private herds will likely reduce to a very small level as there is no commercial gain to be had by hybridization and both the Canadian and American Bison Associations share the goal of preserving pure bison herds. Obtaining bison with minimal cattle introgression is desirable for the conservation of bison.

However, at present, most private herds have yet to be tested for bovine DNA and the majority of plains bison in North America can be found in these private herds. As these herds have been built from the same original base stock as the public herds, is possible that up to 6% of some herds may contain bovine DNA. Consequently, out of approximately 500,000 bison in North America, it is possible that up to 30,000 may have some bovine DNA. Due to many base herds having started pure with feed stock from pure public herds such as Elk Island Park, this may be a high estimate and the true number of bison containing bovine DNA is likely to be significantly lower.
