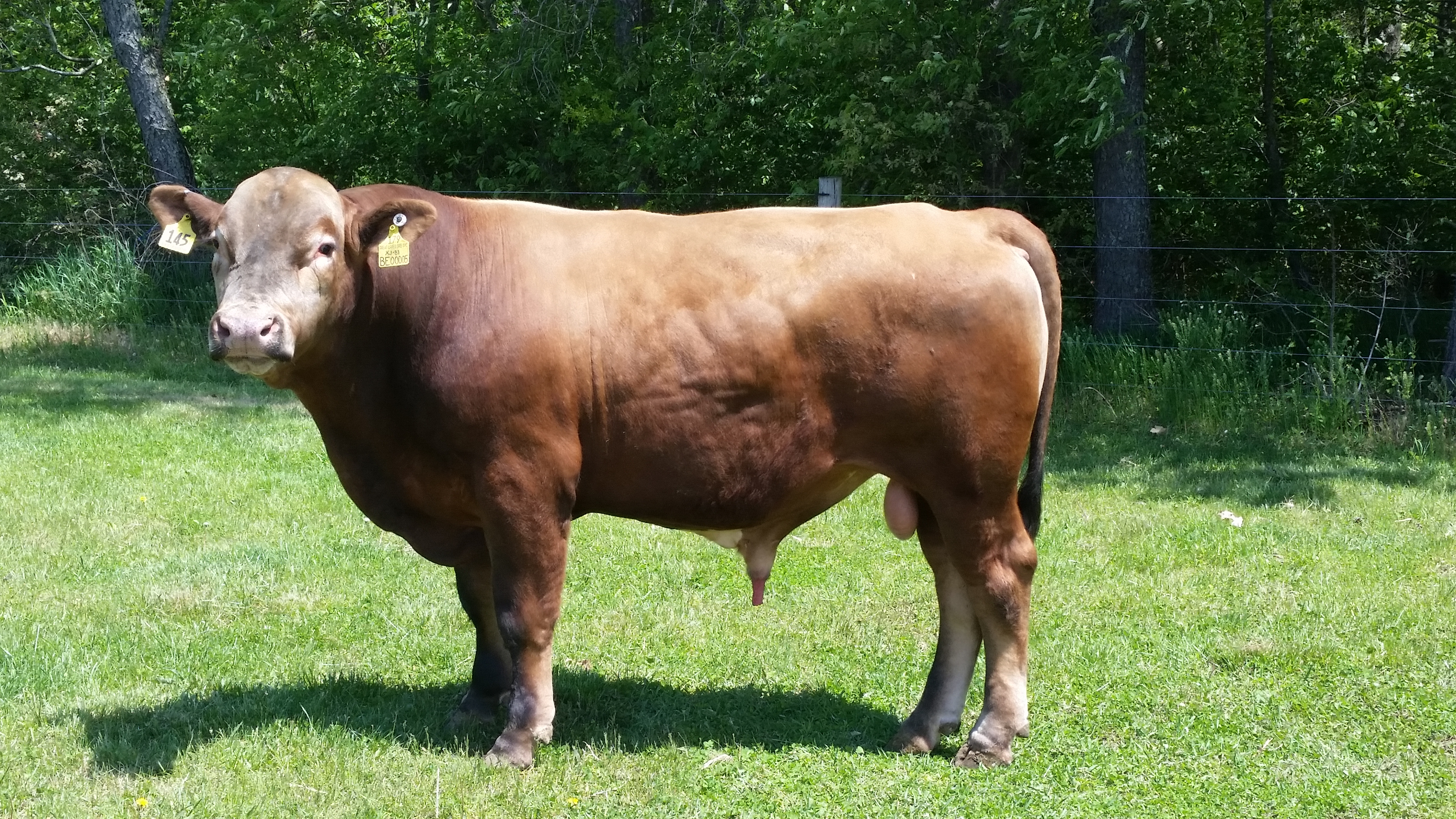
- Beefalo bull

Conservation status
- Domesticated

Scientific classification
- Kingdom: Animalia
- Phylum: Chordata
- Class: Mammalia
- Order: Artiodactyla
- Family: Bovidae
- Subfamily: Bovinae
- Tribe: Bovini
- Subtribe: Bovina
- Hybrid: Bos taurus × Bison bison

= Beefalo =

Hybrid of cattle and bison

Beefalo constitutes a hybrid offspring of domestic cattle (Bos taurus), usually a male, and the American bison (Bison bison), usually a female, in managed breeding programs. The breed was created to combine the characteristics of both animals for beef production.

Beefalo are primarily cattle in genetics and appearance, with the breed association defining a full Beefalo as one with three-eighths (37.5%) bison genetics, while animals with higher percentages of bison genetics are called bison hybrids. However, genomic analysis has found that the vast majority of Beefalo, even those considered pedigree by the breed association, have no detectable bison ancestry, with no sampled Beefalo having higher than 18% bison ancestry, with most Beefalo consisting of a mixture of taurine cattle and zebu cattle ancestry.

== History and genomics ==
Accidental crosses were noticed as long ago as 1749 in the Southern Colonies of North America, during British colonization. Cattle and bison were first intentionally crossbred during the mid-19th century.

One of the first efforts to cross-breed bison and domestic cattle was in 1815 by Robert Wickliffe of Lexington, Kentucky. Mr. Wickliffe's experiments continued for up to 30 years.

Another early deliberate attempt to cross-breed bison with cattle was made by Colonel Samuel Bedson, warden of Stoney Mountain Penitentiary, Winnipeg, in 1880. Bedson bought eight bison from a captive herd of James McKay and inter-bred them with Durham cattle. The hybrids raised by Bedson were described by naturalist Ernest Thompson Seton:

The hybrid animal is [claimed] to be a great improvement on both of its progenitors, as it is more docile and a better milker than the Buffalo, but retains its hardihood, while the robe is finer, darker and more even, and the general shape of the animal is improved by the reduction of the hump and increased proportion of the hind-quarters.

After seeing thousands of cattle die in a blizzard in 1886, Charles "Buffalo" Jones, a co-founder of Garden City, Kansas, also worked to cross bison and cattle at a ranch near the future Grand Canyon National Park, with the hope the animals could survive the harsh winters. He called the result "cattalo" in 1888. Mossom Martin Boyd of Bobcaygeon, Ontario first started the practice in Canada, publishing about some of his outcomes in the Journal of Heredity. After his death in 1914, the Canadian government continued experiments in crossbreeding up to 1964, with little success. For example, in 1936 the Canadian government had successfully cross-bred only 30 cattalos.

It was found early on that crossing a male bison with a domestic cow would produce few offspring, but that crossing a domestic bull with a bison cow apparently solved the problem. The female offspring proved fertile, but rarely so for the males. Although the cattalo performed well, the mating problems meant the breeder had to maintain a herd of wild and difficult-to-handle bison cows.

In 1965, Jim Burnett of Montana produced a hybrid bull that was fertile. Californian cattle rancher D.C. "Bud" Basolo developed the Beefalo breed in the 1970s. He did not reveal the precise pedigree of the breed.

The breed is defined by The American Beefalo Association as being genetically at least five-eighths Bos taurus and at most three-eighths Bison bison.

In 2024, a genetic study, including historical samples from Basolo's foundational herd, found that the majority of Beefalo cattle who were genomically sequenced (39 out of 47 sampled), including those from Basolo's original herd, had no detectable bison ancestry. Of the 8 that did have some bison ancestry, this was no higher than 18% (and as low as 2% in some individuals), which is much lower than that of the supposed pedigree. Most Beefalo were instead found to be either entirely of taurine cattle ancestry or more commonly, mixed with varying levels of zebu ancestry in proportions of 2% to 38%.

== Nutrition characteristics ==
A United States Department of Agriculture study found Beefalo meat, like bison meat, to be lower in fat and cholesterol than standard beef cattle.

== Registration ==
In 1983, the three main Beefalo registration groups reorganized under the American Beefalo World Registry. Until November 2008, there were two Beefalo associations, the American Beefalo World Registry and American Beefalo International. These organizations jointly formed the American Beefalo Association, Inc., which currently operates as the registering body for Beefalo in the United States.

== Effect on bison conservation ==
Most current bison herds are "genetically polluted", meaning that they are partly crossbred with cattle. There are only four genetically unmixed American bison herds left, and only two that are also free of brucellosis: the Wind Cave bison herd that roams Wind Cave National Park, South Dakota; and the Henry Mountains herd in the Henry Mountains of Utah.

Dr. Dirk Van Vuren, formerly of the University of Kansas, however, points out that "The bison today that carry cattle DNA look exactly like bison, function exactly like bison and in fact are bison. For conservation groups, the interest is that they are not totally pure."

== Environmental impacts ==
Although popular with tourists and hunters, escaped beefalo have been destroying parts of the ecosystem, as well as ancient stone ruins, in the Grand Canyon and threatening native species. By 2015, numbers were growing by 50% per year and there were at least 600 animals roaming the park. Grand Canyon National Park was reporting an accident a day due to tourist interactions with beefalo. In 2018, the park began trapping the animals and giving them to Native American tribes outside the state. In addition, volunteer hunters were enlisted to cull the herds, with a goal of reducing the population to 200 animals. As of 2022, the herd was down to 216 individuals, with only 4 having been taken by hunters.

== Cattalo ==
The term cattalo, a portmanteau of cattle and buffalo, is defined by United States law as a cross of bison and cattle which have a bison appearance.

In some American states, cattalo are regulated as exotic animals, along with pure bison and deer. However, in most states, bison and hybrids which are raised solely for livestock purposes similar to cattle, are considered domestic animals like cattle, and do not require special permits.

== See also ==
- American Breed
- Bovid hybrid
- Buddy the Beefalo
- Dzo
- Haldane's rule
- Madura cattle
- Yakalo
- Żubroń
