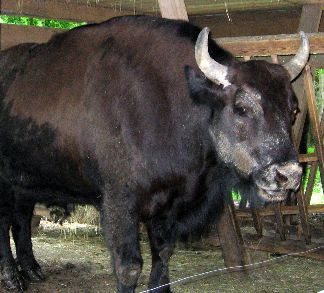
- A żubroń in Białowieża National Park

Conservation status
- Domesticated

Scientific classification
- Kingdom: Animalia
- Phylum: Chordata
- Class: Mammalia
- Order: Artiodactyla
- Family: Bovidae
- Subfamily: Bovinae
- Tribe: Bovini
- Subtribe: Bovina
- Hybrid: Bos taurus × Bison bonasus

= Żubroń =

Cattle and European bison hybrid

Żubroń (/ˈʒuːbrɒnj/; Polish: żubroń [ˈʐubrɔɲ]) is a hybrid of a domestic cattle and a wisent (European bison). The wisent (żubr in Polish) is the European bison; hence, the żubroń is analogous to the American cattalo. The name żubroń was officially chosen from hundreds of proposals sent to the Polish weekly magazine Przekrój during a contest organised in 1969.

== History ==
The żubroń was first created by Leopold Walicki in 1847, although the hybrid may also have appeared at an earlier time. After World War I, various scientists considered żubroń a possible replacement for domestic cattle. Żubroń turned out to be more durable and less susceptible to disease. In addition, the animal could be bred on marginal grazing land with no farm infrastructure and with minimal husbandry in huge state agricultural farms (SAFs). From 1958, the work on żubroń herds was continued by the Polish Academy of Sciences in various laboratories, most notably in Białowieża and Młodzikowo. During the first 16 years of experiments, a total of 71 animals were born, including Filon, the first żubroń born to a żubroń mother (August 6, 1960). The animal was intended to become a hardy and cheap alternative to cattle.

The experiment was continued until the late 1980s when the results of the breeding programmes were deemed unsatisfactory. Various factors contributed to this decision, including the severe economic difficulties of the Polish socialist economy in the 1980s, a lack of interest from the notoriously ineffective SAFs, and fears that żubroń would crossbreed with the endangered wild wisent, contaminating their gene pool. The two notable centres for experiments on the species were Łękno (391 animals all together) and Popielno (121 animals), while limited experiments were also held in the reserve of Askania Nova in the USSR. This was discontinued, and the sole surviving herd consists of several animals only, kept at Bialowieski National Park. As of 2007, however, there are press releases suggesting the breeding and experiments are continuing in Karolew in Greater Poland.

== Description ==
Żubroń are heavy animals, with males weighing up to 1,200 kg (2,600 lb) and females up to 810 kg (1,790 lb). They are strong, resistant to disease, and tolerant of harsh weather conditions. The first-cross calves have to be born by Caesarean section, because although they may be carried successfully to full term, parturition never occurs. Males are infertile in the first generation. Females are fertile and can be crossbred with either parent species (i.e., cattle or wisent), and males from these backcrosses are fertile.

== See also ==
- Beefalo
- Bovid hybrid
- Dzo
- Haldane's rule
- Yakalo
