= Lower Kinabatangan Segama Wetlands =

Wetland in Sabah, Malaysia

Designations

Ramsar Wetland
- Official name: Lower Kinabatangan-Segama Wetlands
- Designated: 8 September 2008
- Reference no.: 1849

The Lower Kinabatangan Segama Wetlands are situated in Sabah, Malaysia. They cover 788.03 km^{2}. The Kinabatangan Orangutan Conservation Project was established in 1998 to secure the population in the Kinabatangan floodplain of eastern Sabah (McConkey et al. 2005).

The Lower Kinabatangan-Segama Wetlands was added to the Ramsar List of Wetlands of International Importance on October 28, 2008 (Ramsar Site # 1849). The Lower Kinagatangan-Segama Wetlands are one of six Wetlands of International Importance in Malaysia. These wetlands are threatened by the expansion of oil palm plantations, especially in the upriver portion of the wetlands and tributary catchment.

Total- 78,803 hectares (ha); comprising the three Forest Reserves: Trusan Kinabatangan Forest Reserve (40,471 ha), Kulamba Wildlife Reserve (20,682 ha), and Kuala Maruap and Kuala Segama Forest Reserve (17,650 ha).

== Sources ==
- McConkey, K., Caldecott, J. and McManus, E. 2005. Malaysia. In Caldecott, J., Miles, L. (eds) 2005. World Atlas of Great Apes and their Conservatrion. Prepared by the UNEP World Conservation Monitoring Centre. University of California Press, Berkeley, USA.
