= American Breed =

Breed of cattle with bison blood

- Conservation status: FAO (2007): no data
- Country of origin: United States
- Use: Beef

Traits
- Horn status: Sometimes horned

Notes
- Bovid hybrid

The American Breed is an American bovid hybrid of cattle used for meat with a small percentage of American bison blood. It was developed in the 1950s by a New Mexico rancher looking for beef cattle which could survive on poor fodder in the arid Southwest.

It is one of the few cattle breeds with any known Bison influence, another being the Beefalo. Art Jones, the original breeder, began by crossing Hereford, Shorthorn and Charolais, and later added extensive crosses with Brahman and Bison. All individuals of this rare breed display the genetic marker for Bison ancestry.

In 2007, its conservation status was unknown. A breed society was established in 1976; in 2016, it was inactive.
