= Crossbreed =

Animal with parents of differing breeds

A crossbreed is an organism with purebred parents of two different breeds, varieties, or populations. A domestic animal of unknown ancestry, where the breed status of only one parent or grandparent is known, may also be called a crossbreed though the term "mixed breed" is technically more accurate. Outcrossing is a type of crossbreeding used within a purebred breed to increase the genetic diversity within the breed, particularly when there is a need to avoid inbreeding.

In animal breeding, crossbreeds are crosses within a single species, while hybrids are crosses between different species. In plant breeding terminology, the term crossbreed is uncommon, and no universal term is used to distinguish hybridization or crossing within a population from those between populations, or even those between species.

Crossbreeding is the process of breeding such an organism. It can be beneficially used to maintain health and viability of organisms. However, irresponsible crossbreeding can also produce organisms of inferior quality or dilute a purebred gene pool to the point of extinction of a given breed of organism.

== Crossbreeds in specific animals ==
Cats: The many newly developed and recognized breeds of domestic cat are crossbreeds between existing, well-established breeds (sometimes with limited hybridization with some wild species), to either combine selected traits from the foundation stock, or propagate a rare mutation without excessive inbreeding. However, some nascent breeds such as the Aegean cat are developed entirely from a local landrace population. Most experimental cat breeds are crossbreeds.

Cattle: In cattle, there are systems of crossbreeding. In many crossbreeds, one animal is larger than the other. One is used when the purebred females are particularly adapted to a specific environment, and are crossed with purebred bulls from another environment to produce a generation having traits of both parents.

Sheep: The large number of breeds of sheep, which vary greatly, creates an opportunity for crossbreeding to be used to tailor production of lambs to the goal of the individual stockman.

Llamas: Results of crossbreeding classic and woolly breeds of llama are unpredictable. The resulting offspring displays physical characteristics of either parent, or a mix of characteristics from both, periodically producing a fleeced llama. The results are increasingly unpredictable when both parents are crossbreeds, with possibility of the offspring displaying characteristics of a grandparent, not obvious in either parent.

Dogs:

A crossbred dog is a cross between two (sometimes more) known breeds, and is usually distinguished from a mixed-breed dog, which has ancestry from many sources, some of which may not be known. Crossbreeds are popular, due to the belief that they have increased vigor without loss of attractiveness of the dog. Certain planned crossbreeding between purebred dogs of different breeds are now widely known as "designer dogs" and can produce puppies worth more than their purebred parents, due to a high demand.

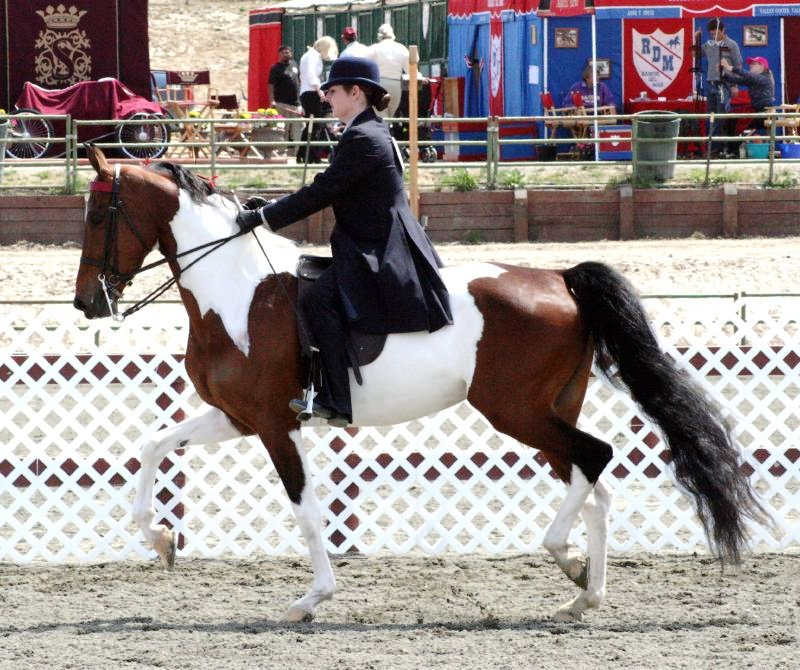
The National Show Horse was developed from crossbreeding programs in the 1970s and 1980s that blended Arabian horse and American Saddlebred bloodlines

Horses: Crossbreeding horses is often done with the intent of ultimately creating a new breed of horse. One type of modern crossbreeding in horses created many of the warmblood breeds used in the sport horse disciplines, usually registered in an open stud book by a studbook selection procedure that evaluates conformation, pedigree and, in some animals, a training or performance standard. Most warmblood breeds began as a cross of draft horse breeds on Thoroughbreds, but have, in some cases, developed over the past century to the point where they are considered to be a true-breeding population and have a closed stud book. Other types of recognized crossbreeding include that within the American Quarter Horse, which will register horses with one Thoroughbred parent and one registered Quarter Horse parent in the "Appendix" registry, and allow such animals full breed registration status as Quarter Horses if they meet a certain performance standard. Another well-known crossbred horse is the Anglo-Arabian, which may be produced by a purebred Arabian horse crossed on a Thoroughbred, or by various crosses of Anglo-Arabians with other Anglo-Arabians, as long as the ensuing animal never has more than 75% or less than 25% of each breed represented in its pedigree.

== Hybrid animals ==
A hybrid animal is one with parentage of two separate species, differentiating it from crossbred animals, which have parentage of the same species. Hybrids are usually, but not always, sterile.

One of the most ancient types of hybrid animal is the mule, a cross between a female horse and a male donkey. The liger is a hybrid cross between a male lion and female tiger. The yattle is a cross between a cow and a yak. Other crosses include the tigon (between a male tiger and female lion) and yakalo (between a yak and an American bison). The Incas recognized that hybrids of Lama glama (llama) and Vicugna pacos (alpaca) resulted in a hybrid with none of the advantages of either parent.

At one time it was thought that dogs and wolves were separate species, and the crosses between dogs and wolves were called wolf hybrids. Today wolves and dogs are both recognized as Canis lupus, but the old term "wolf hybrid" is still used.

== Mixed breeds ==
A mixed-breed animal is defined as having undocumented or unknown parentage, while a crossbreed generally has known, usually purebred parents of two distinct breeds or varieties. A dog of unknown parentage is often called a mixed-breed dog, "mutt" or "mongrel." A cat of unknown parentage is often referred to as a domestic short-haired or domestic long-haired cat generically, and in some dialects is often called a "moggie". A horse of unknown bloodlines is called a grade horse.

== Designer crossbreed ==
Examples of designer crossbreds

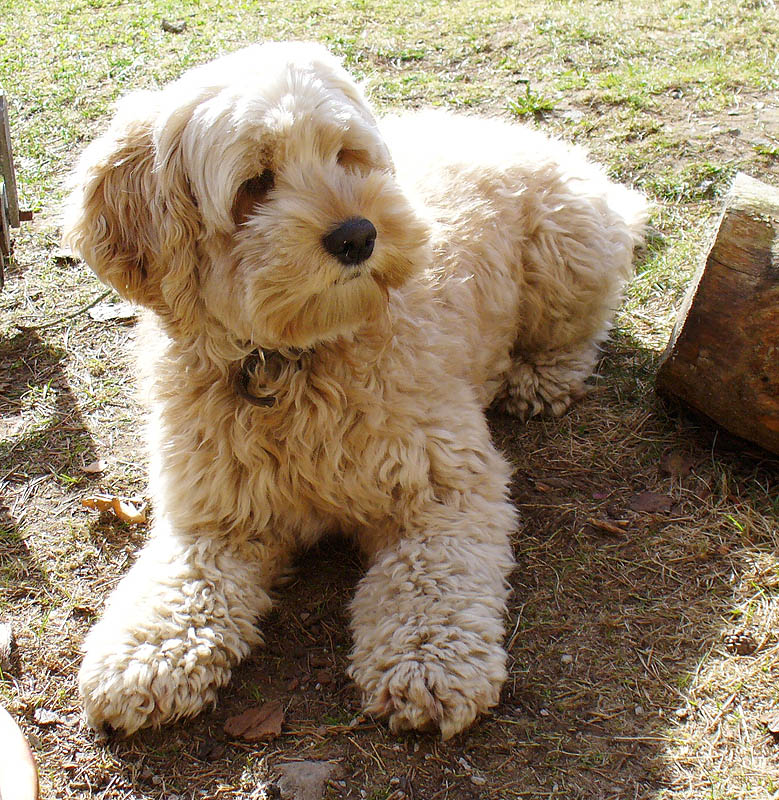
A Cockapoo is a Poodle/Cocker Spaniel cross

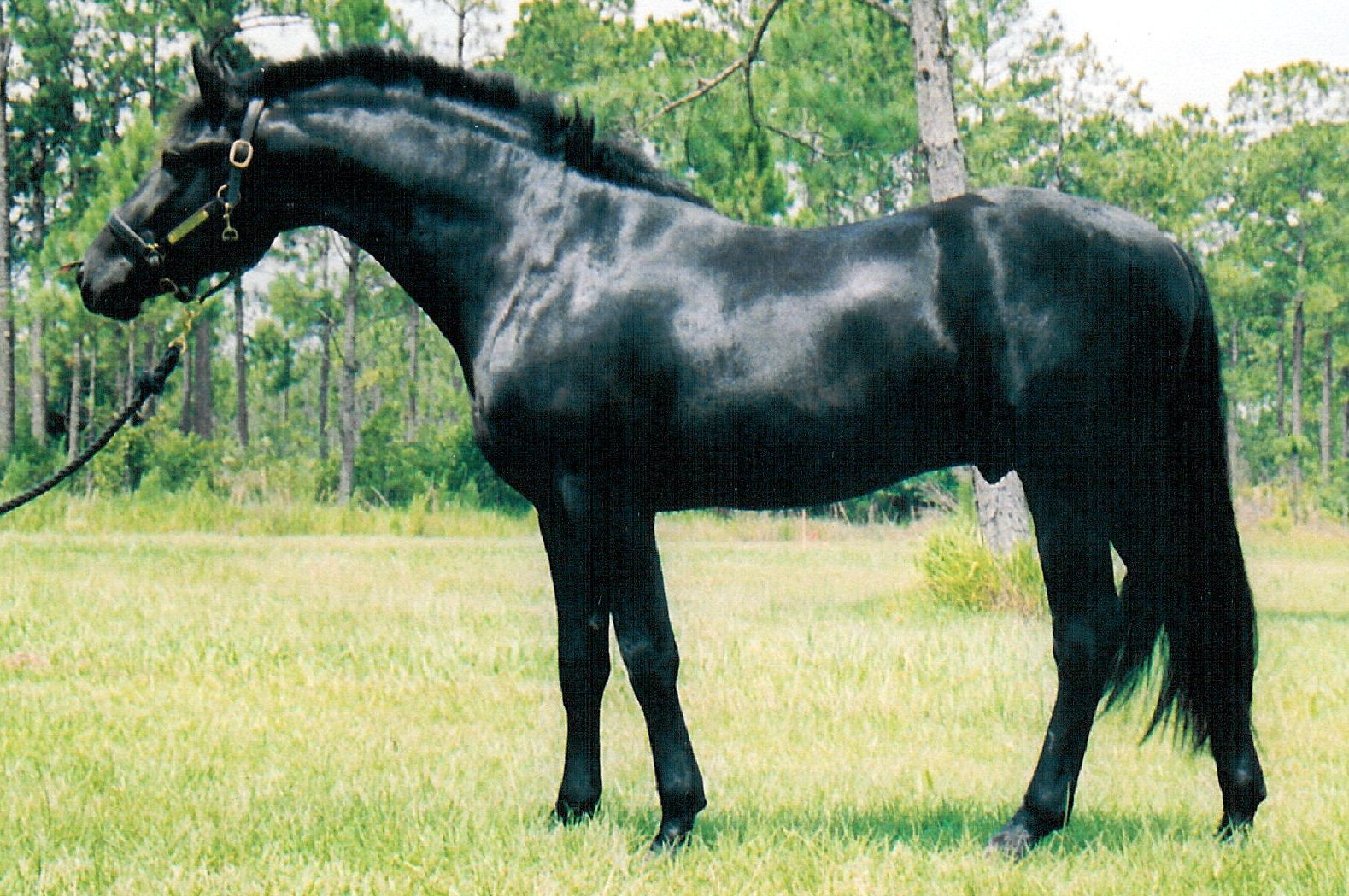
A Friesian Sport Horse horse is a cross between a Friesian and one of several other breeds

A designer crossbreed or designer breed is a crossbred animal with purebred parents, usually registered with a breed registry, but from two different breeds. These animals are the result of a deliberate decision to create a specific crossbred animal. Less often, the animal may have more than two pure breeds in its ancestry, but unlike a mutt or a mongrel, its entire pedigree is known to descend from specific known animals. While the term is best known when applied to certain dog crossbreeds, other animals such as cattle, horses, birds and cats may also be bred in this fashion. Some crossbred breeders start a freestanding breed registry to record designer crossbreds, other crossbreds may be included in an "appendix" to an existing purebred registry. either form of registration may be the first step in recording and tracking pedigrees in order to develop a new breed.

The purpose of creating designer crossbreds is usually one or more of the following reasons:

1. to breed animals with heterosis, commonly known as "hybrid vigor",
2. to create animals with more predictable characteristics than mixed breed or mongrel breeding,
3. to avoid certain undesirable recessive traits that lead to genetic diseases that plague many purebred animals,
4. to develop an animal that combines what are viewed as the best traits of two or more breeds,
5. as the preliminary steps toward developing a new animal breed.

Breeders of designer crossbreds borrow the technical language from hybrid plant breeding: A first generation, 50–50 crossbred is an F1 cross. Subsequent generations may see a purebred animal crossed back on a crossbred, creating a 75/25 cross, or a BC1 or F1b "backcross." The breeding of two crossbreeds of the same combination of breeds, creating an F2 cross, an animal that is still a 50–50 cross, but it is the second filial generation of the combination. An F2 cross bred to an F2 cross creates an F3 cross. Similarly, an F2 animal bred to an F1 animal creates an F2b backcross. F3 crosses and greater are called "multi-generational" crosses. In dog breeding, three generations of reliable documented breeding can be considered a "breed" rather than a crossbreed.

There are disadvantages to creating designer crossbreeds, notably the potential that the cross will be of inferior quality or that it will not produce as consistent a result as would breeding purebred animals. For example, the Poodle is a frequent breed used in creation of designer crossbreeds, due to its non-shedding coat, but that trait does not always breed true when it is part of a designer cross. Also, because breeders of crossbred animals may be less careful about genetic testing and weeding out undesirable traits, certain deleterious dominant genes may still be passed on to a crossbreed offspring. In an F2 cross, recessive genetic traits may also return if the parent animals were both carriers of an undesired trait,

== See also ==
- Artificial selection
- Canid hybrid
- Heterosis
- Introgression
- Selective breeding
