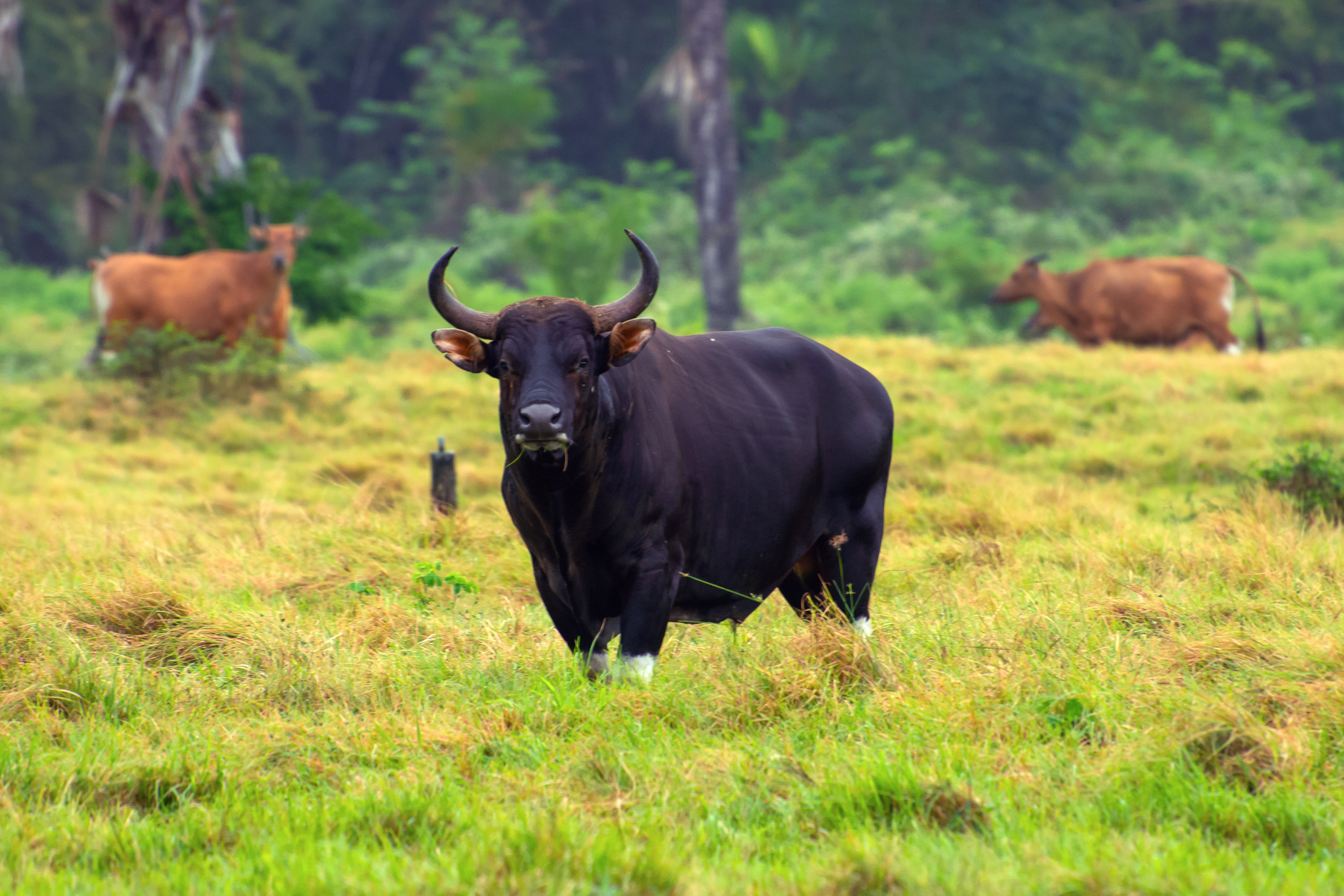

Conservation status
- Critically Endangered (IUCN 3.1)

Scientific classification
- Kingdom: Animalia
- Phylum: Chordata
- Class: Mammalia
- Order: Artiodactyla
- Family: Bovidae
- Subfamily: Bovinae
- Genus: Bos
- Species: B. javanicus

Binomial name
- Bos javanicus d'Alton, 1823

Subspecies
- List: Javan banteng (B. j. javanicus) d'Alton, 1823; Indochinese (or Burma) banteng (B. j. birmanicus) Lydekker, 1898; Bornean banteng (B. j. lowi) Lydekker, 1912; Bali banteng (B. j. domesticus) Wilckens, 1905
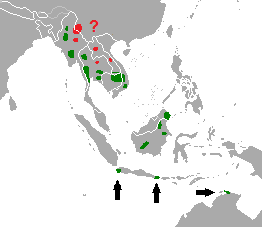
- Distribution of banteng (2010) green: present red: possibly present

Synonyms
- List: Bos leucoprymnus Quoy & Gaimard, 1830; Bos banteng Temminck, 1836; Bos Sondaicus S. Müller in Temminck, 1840; Bos Bentinger E. Blyth, 1842; Bos Sondaicus E. Blyth, 1842; Bos Bentiger Roulin, 1842; Bos sondaicus Schlegel & S. Müller in Temminck, 1842; Bos Banteng J. A. Wagner, 1844; Bos bantinger Schlegel & S. Müller in Temminck, 1845

= Banteng =

Banteng Temporal range: Middle Pleistocene-Present

Species of wild bovine

The banteng (Bos javanicus; /ˈbæntɛŋ/), also known as the tembadau, is a species of wild bovine found in Southeast Asia, with domestic-wild hybrids present in parts of Northern Australia.

The head-and-body length is between 1.9 and 3.68 m (6.2 and 12.1 ft). Wild banteng are typically larger and heavier than their domesticated counterparts, but are otherwise similar in appearance. The banteng shows extensive sexual dimorphism; adult bulls are generally dark brown to black, larger and more sturdily built than adult cows, which are thinner and usually pale brown or chestnut red. There is a big white patch on the rump. Horns are present on both sexes, and are typically 60 to 95 cm (24 to 37 in) long. Three subspecies are generally recognised.

Banteng are active during the day as well as at night, though activity at night is more in areas frequented by humans. Herds comprise two to forty individuals, and generally a single bull. Being herbivorous, banteng feed on vegetation such as grasses, sedges, shoots, leaves, flowers, and fruits. Banteng can survive without water for long stretches during droughts, but drink regularly if possible, especially from standing water. Not much is known about the reproductive physiology of banteng, but it might be similar to that observed in taurine cattle. After a gestation of nearly 285 days (nine to ten months), a week longer than that typically observed in taurine cattle, a single calf is born. Banteng occur in a variety of habitats throughout their range, including open deciduous forests, semi-evergreen forests, lower montane forests, grasslands, and abandoned farms.

The largest populations of wild banteng occur in Java, Cambodia, and possibly in Kalimantan (particularly East Kalimantan and North Kalimantan) and Thailand. Domesticated banteng occur in Bali and many eastern Indonesian islands (such as Sulawesi, Sumbawa, and Sumba), Australia, Malaysia, and New Guinea. Feral populations are found in Sabah and the Northern Territory of Australia. Domesticated populations are primarily used for their highly demanded meat, and are used as draught animals to a lesser extent. The wild banteng is classified as Critically Endangered on the IUCN Red List, and populations have decreased by more than 50% in the past few decades. Rampant poaching (for food, game, traditional medicine and horns), habitat loss and fragmentation and susceptibility to disease are major threats throughout its range. Wild banteng are legally protected in all countries in their range, and are largely restricted to protected areas (possibly barring Cambodia). The banteng is the second endangered species to be successfully cloned, and the first clone to survive beyond infancy.

== Taxonomy and phylogeny ==
The banteng was first described by German naturalist Joseph Wilhelm Eduard d'Alton in 1823. "Banteng" derived from the Javanese/Sundanese name for the animal (banṭéng). D'Alton based his description on two skulls from Java (Indonesia), a male and a female; while he described the male as a banteng, he referred to the female simply as a wild ox from Java. In 1956, Dirk Albert Hooijer of the Rijksmuseum van Natuurlijke Historie (Leiden), where the skulls were first brought to from Java, noted that d'Alton used the name Bibos javanicus, or Bos (Bibos) javanicus if Bibos is considered a subgenus (as it is by some authors), to describe the male.

Bos leucoprymnus was suggested as a synonym in 1830, but was pointed out to be a cross between a wild banteng and a domesticated individual; Hooijer wrote that he could not infer that this was the case from the original description, and, even if it were a cross, the name would not become invalid. Other names proposed for the banteng include Bos banteng and Bos bantinger. In a 1845 revision of d'Alton's description, the authors opined that both the specimens were wild oxen, referring to them as Bos sondaicus instead. They mistook the female for a young male, an error that continued in several publications by later authors.

Fossils of banteng are known from the Middle Pleistocene of Thailand along with Stegodon, gaur, wild water buffalo and other living and extinct mammals.

=== Subspecies ===
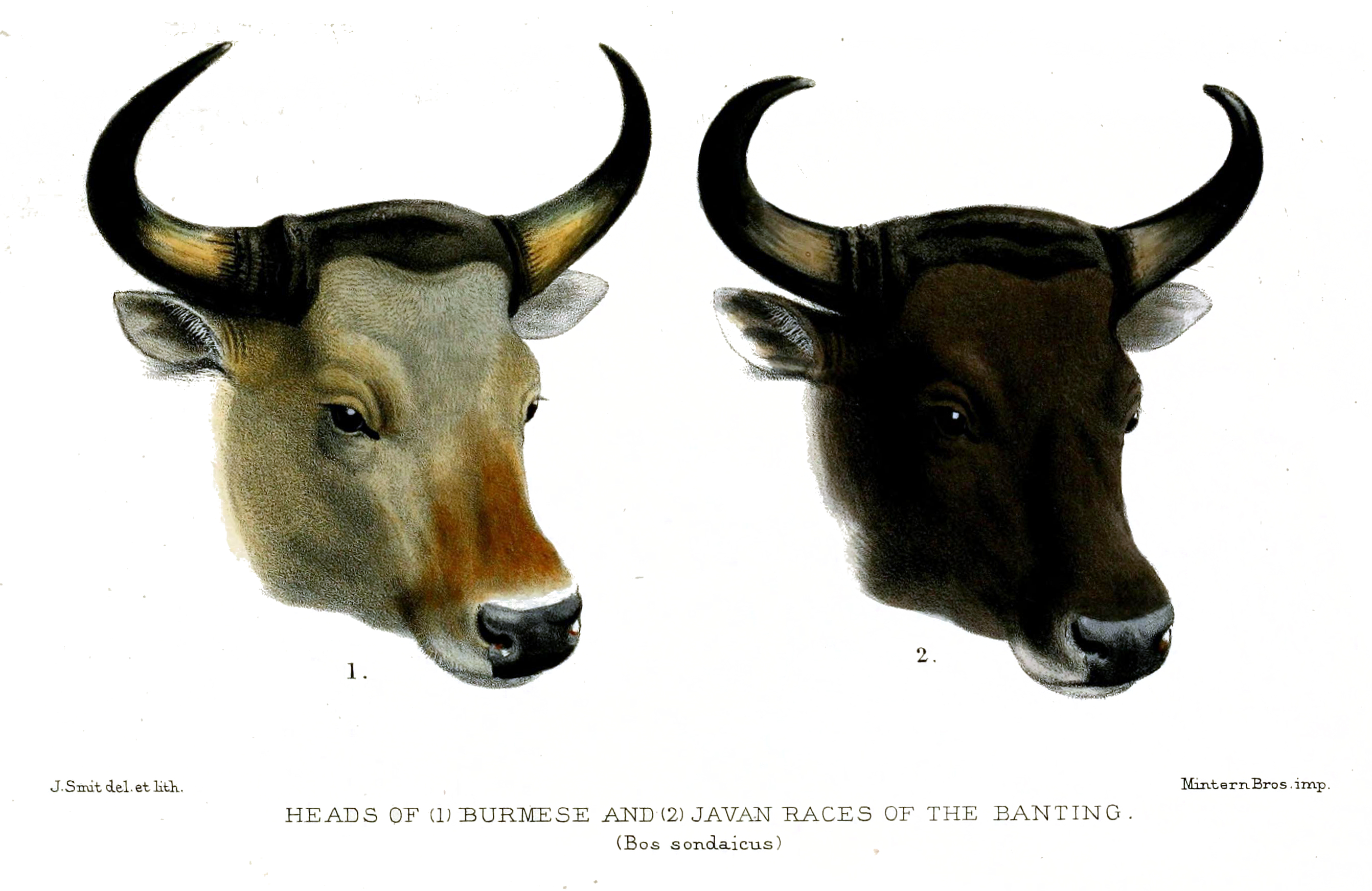
A comparison between Indochinese (left) and Javan (right) banteng in facial features (Proceedings of the Zoological Society of London, 1898)

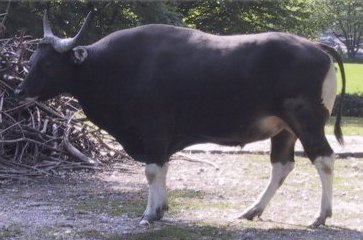
Bulls of the Javan subspecies (Bos javanicus javanicus) are black.

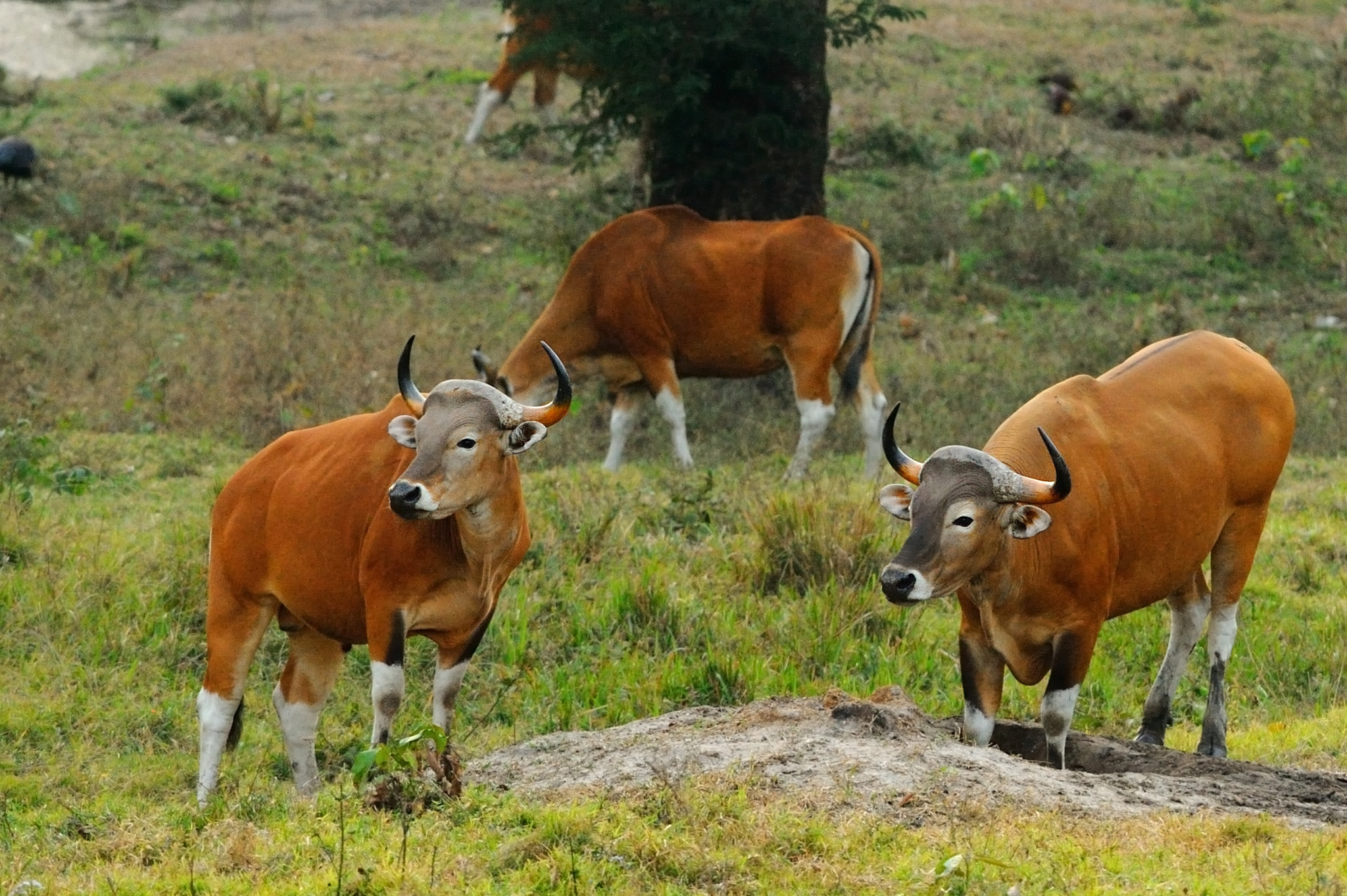
Bulls of the Indochinese subspecies (Bos javanicus birmanicus), like those at Huai Kha Khaeng Wildlife Sanctuary (Thailand) are commonly reddish-yellow.

Four subspecies are generally recognised based on phenotypic differences, though some authors do not accept these, citing extensive breeding between the small remaining banteng populations and other sympatric cattle. The details of these subspecies are given below:

- Javan banteng (B. j. javanicus) d'Alton, 1823: Occurs in Java and possibly Bali.
- Indochinese (or Burma) banteng (B. j. birmanicus) Lydekker, 1898: Occurs on the Southeast Asian mainland.
- Bali cattle (B. j. domesticus) Wilckens, 1905: Occurs in Bali, Australia, East Timor, Malaysia, the Philippines and New Guinea
- Bornean banteng (B. j. lowi) Lydekker, 1912: Occurs only in Borneo.

A 2015 phylogenetic study obtained the complete mitochondrial genome of the Bornean banteng. It showed that the Bornean banteng is closer to the gaur (Bos gaurus) than it is to other banteng subspecies, having diverged from the gaur around 5.03 million years ago. Moreover, the Bornean banteng is genetically distant from taurine cattle and zebu, indicating that the wild Bornean banteng could not have hybridised with them, and therefore might form a purebreeding line. These researchers suggested that the Bornean banteng could be an independent species. A later study in 2021 by Sindling et al., which included the genome of the closely related and now likely extinct kouprey (Bos sauveli) from Cambodia, suggested that on the level of the nuclear genome, the gaur, kouprey and banteng were distinct species, but due to incomplete lineage sorting as a result of interbreeding between their ancestors, their mitochondrial genomes did not correspond to species-specific lineages. Admixture analysis suggested that East Asian zebu cattle may have ancestry derived from banteng.

Relationships of members of the genus Bos based on nuclear genomes after Sinding, et al. 2021.

- Bos
  - Bos primigenius +Bos taurus (aurochs and cattle)
  - - - Bos mutus (wild yak)
      - - Bison bison (American bison)
        - Bison bonasus (European bison/wisent)
    - - Bos javanicus (banteng)
      - Bos gaurus (gaur)
      - Bos sauveli (kouprey)

== Characteristics ==
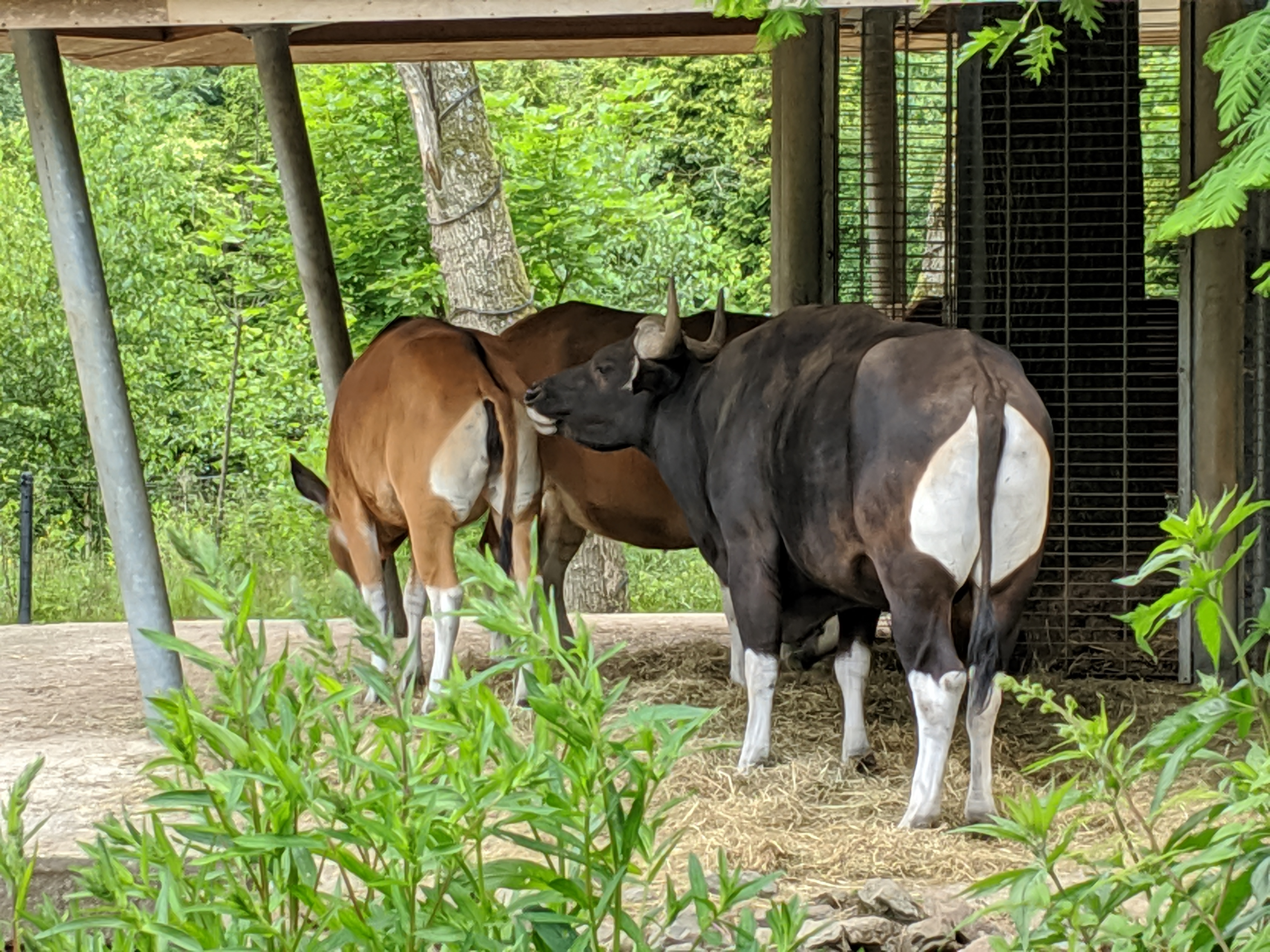
Banteng have a large white patch on the rump.

The banteng is similar to taurine cattle, with head-and-body length between 1.9 and 2.25 m (6.2 and 7.4 ft). Wild banteng are typically larger and heavier than their domesticated counterparts, but are otherwise similar in appearance. The mean shoulder height of wild Javan and Indochinese banteng is 1.4 m (4.6 ft) for cows and 1.6 m (5.2 ft) for bulls; Bornean banteng, the smallest subspecies, are shorter. Domesticated banteng cows reach 1.2 m (3.9 ft) at the shoulder, while the bulls are 1.3–1.5 m (4.3–4.9 ft) tall. In the wild cows weigh around 590–670 kg (1,300–1,480 lb), while bulls weigh around 600–800 kg (1,300–1,800 lb). Weights of domesticated individuals range from 211 to 242 kg (465 to 534 lb) for females and from 335 to 363 kg (739 to 800 lb) for males. The largest bulls attain 3.3 and 3.7 m (11 and 12 ft) between pegs (nose to rump) with 0.9 and 0.95 m (3.0 and 3.1 ft) long tail, 1.76 and 1.91 m (5.8 and 6.3 ft) at the withers, and weigh 900 kg (2,000 lb) or more.

The banteng shows extensive sexual dimorphism; adult bulls are generally dark brown to black, larger and more sturdily built than adult cows, that are thinner and usually pale brown or chestnut red. Females and juveniles additionally have a dark line running along their back. Some bulls may retain their brown colour, sometimes with white spots similar to those seen in deer. The coat of young bulls is reddish brown, and progressively attains the adult colouration starting from the front to the rear parts. Aged bulls may turn grey. The underparts are white to light brown. The face is lighter relative to the rest of the body, whitish or tawny grey at the forehead and around the eyes but darker near the black snout. There is a big white patch on the rump, poorly developed in the Indochinese banteng; the patch may serve as a guide for herds to stay together in the dark. The legs are white below the knees. The back is particularly elevated in bulls due to the unusual lengths of the thoracic vertebrae, giving the impression of a hump. Horns are typically 60 to 75 cm (24 to 30 in) long, and separated by thick skin at the base. Bulls have long, slender horns with sharp tips and a circular cross-section, and are smooth except for the wrinkled base. The horns of cows are short and tightly curved, pointing inward at the tips, while those of bulls arc upwards and slightly forward. The tail, measuring 65 to 70 cm (26 to 28 in), ends in a black tuft.

== Ecology and behaviour ==
Banteng are active during the day as well as at night, though activity at night is more in areas frequented by humans. They typically form herds of two to forty individuals consisting of a single bull, cows and young. Older males form groups of two or three. Banteng are timid and reclusive, and tend to be highly alert, making approach difficult. Domestic individuals get stressed easily, and need to be handled with care. They rest and seek shelter for safety in dense forests. Banteng, particularly cows and calves, walk fast and manoeuvre easily through dense cover. Predators of adult banteng include the local populations of tigers and dholes (Asian wild dogs). Banteng use their strong sense of smell to detect predators and as a means of communication within a herd. Their hearing is also highly developed. Vocalisations such as roars and bellows might be common during the breeding season; calves within seven months may produce soft eng sounds. High-pitched cries are used to raise alarm.

=== Diet and foraging ===
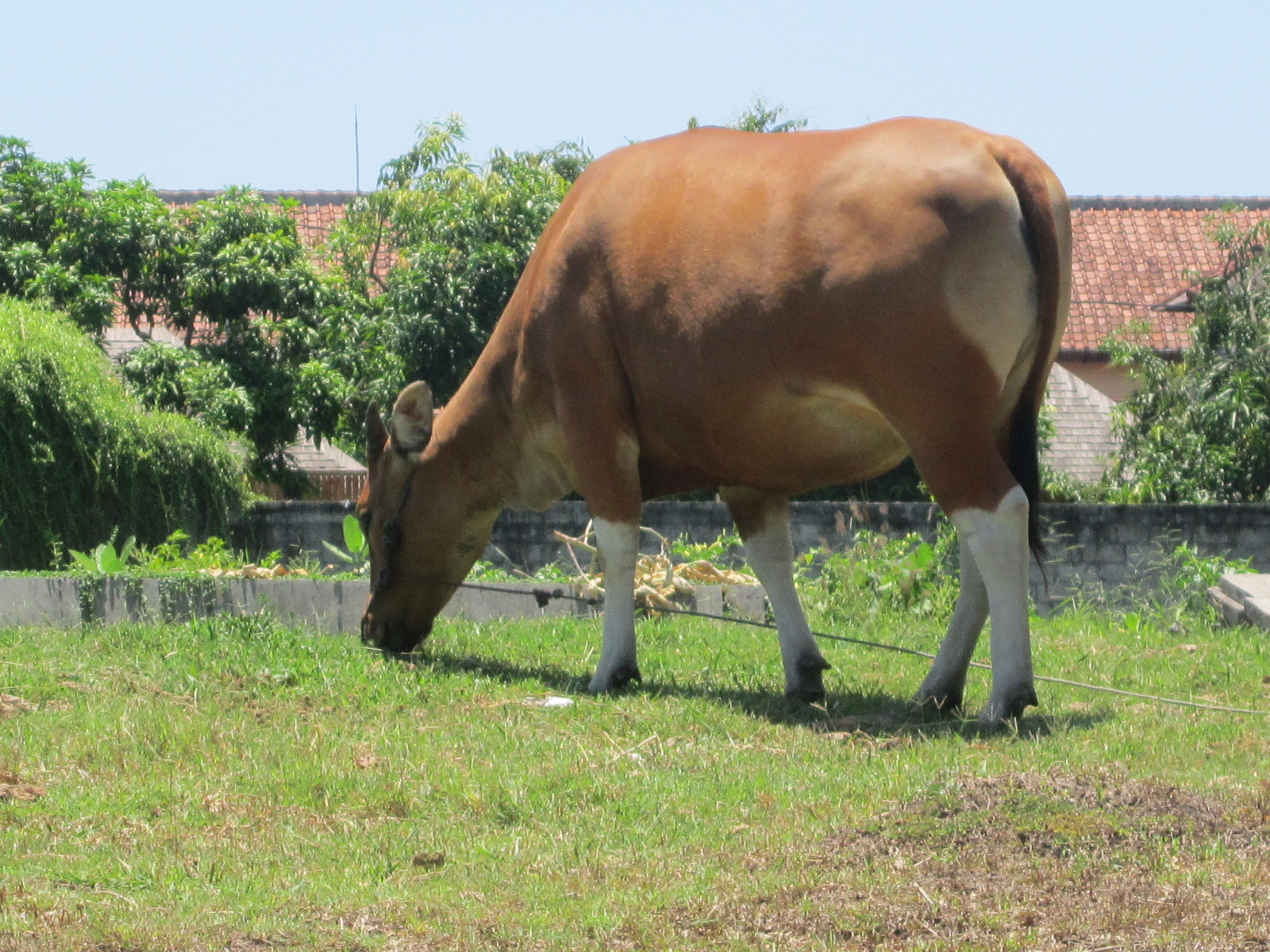
Banteng feed on vegetation such as grasses.

Herbivores, banteng feed on vegetation such as grasses, sedges, shoots, leaves, flowers and fruits. They forage at night in open areas, taking breaks of two to three hours in between to ruminate and rest. They may move to forests at higher altitudes to forage during the rainy season. A study in Deramakot Forest Reserve (Sabah) showed the presence of several herbal seeds (such as Mimosa pudica and Paspalum conjugatum), bamboo (probably Dinochloa species) and tree bark in faecal samples. A study in West Java showed that banteng grazed mostly on the grasses Axonopus compressus, Cynodon dactylon, Ischaemum muticum and P. conjugatum, and the woody shrub Psychotria malayana. Banteng can survive without water for several days during droughts, but drink regularly if possible, especially from standing water. They frequent salt licks to satisfy their salt requirements; in the absence of licks they drink sea water instead. Banteng can drink highly saline water, and have been observed feeding on seaweed in northern Australia.

=== Reproduction and life cycle ===
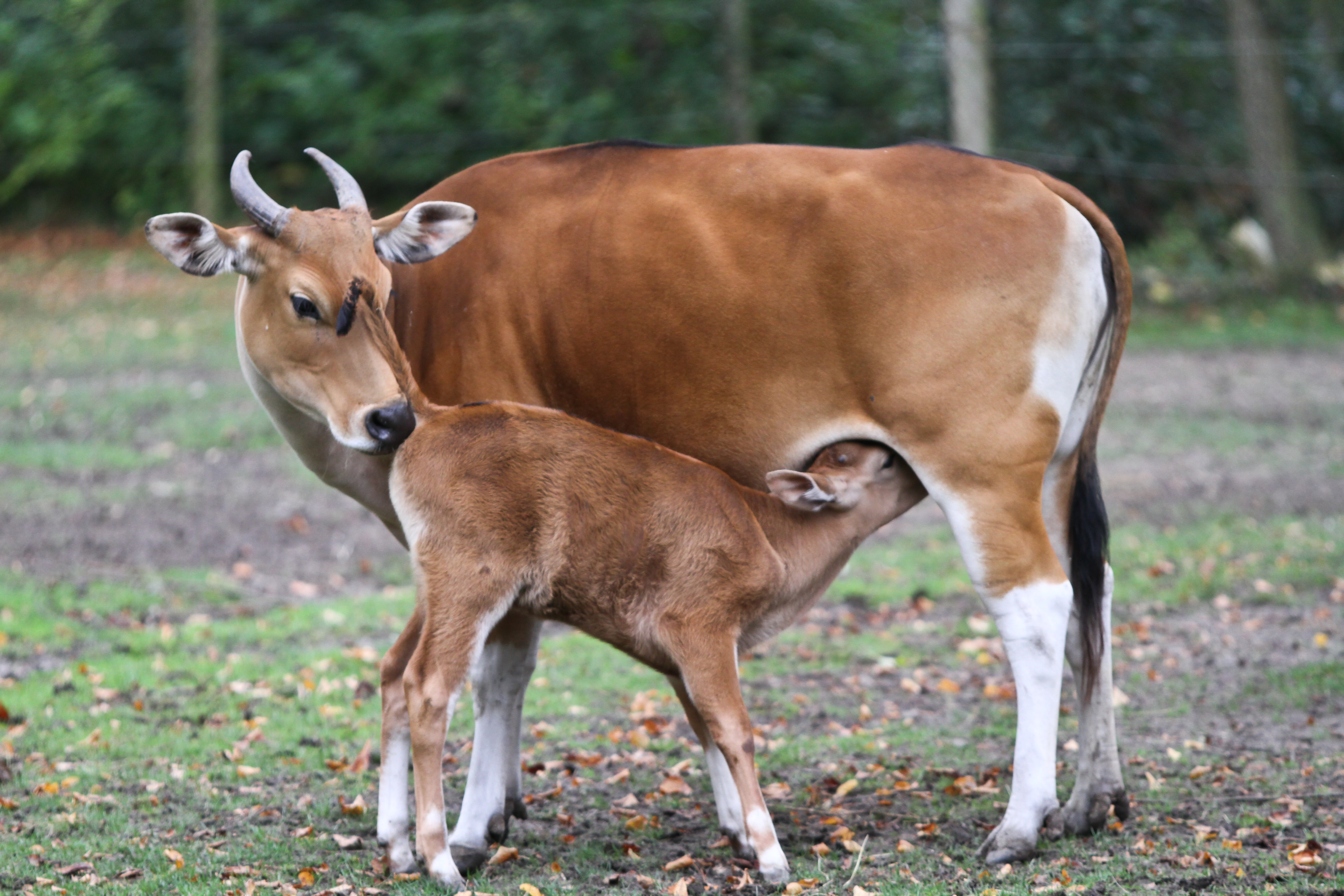
A mother with her calf

Not much is known about the reproductive physiology of banteng, but it might be similar to that observed in taurine cattle. Domestic banteng can become sexually mature at as early as 13 months of age, and breed after another three months. They conceive easily, with a conception rate of 80–90% recorded in northern Australia. Breeding has been observed throughout the year in captivity and in wild banteng in Myanmar, though wild individuals on Cobourg Peninsula mate mainly in October and November, and in Thailand mating peaks in May and June. After a gestation of nearly 285 days (nine to ten months), a week longer than that typically observed in taurine cattle, a single calf is born. Males weigh 16–17 kg (35–37 lb) at birth, while females weigh 14–15 kg (31–33 lb). Young are suckled for as long as 16 months, though some cows may continue nursing till the birth of their next calf. A study of wild banteng on Cobourg Peninsula showed that males become sexually mature at three to four years and females at two to four years; males attain their full-grown size five to six years, while females grow completely by three to four years. Calf mortality is high in the first six months of life, and declines quickly thereafter with increasing body size. Banteng live for as long as 26 years.

=== Diseases and parasites ===
Banteng host several endoparasites such as liver flukes (that cause fasciolosis), intestinal worms (such as Strongyloides papillosus) and Paramphistomum species (that cause paramphistomiasis). Banteng are susceptible to bovine malignant catarrhal fever caused by ovine gammaherpesvirus 2 (OvHV-2). Bali ziekte, which is a skin disease seen exclusively in banteng, begins with a dry eczema, worsening to necrosis and lacerated mucous membranes in the affected area. Other diseases including blackleg and bovine viral diarrhoea, have caused several deaths in captivity.

Ectoparasites recorded in banteng include Amblyomma testudinarium, Haemaphysalis cornigera and Rhipicephalus species. Like water buffaloes, banteng have considerable immunity against ticks and tick-borne diseases. A study in northern Australia revealed a mutually symbiotic relationship between banteng and the Torresian crow, that fed off ectoparasites (possibly ixodid ticks) from exposed parts of the banteng's body, mainly between the hind legs. This is especially notable, as it is the first known symbiotic relationship between a native bird species and a non-native wild mammal, and it took only 150 years to develop.

== Habitat and distribution ==
Banteng occur in a variety of habitats throughout their range, including open deciduous forests, semi-evergreen forests, lower montane forests, abandoned farms and grasslands. They occur up to an elevation of 2,100 m (6,900 ft) above the sea level. The largest populations of wild banteng occur in Cambodia, Java and possibly in Borneo, Viet Nam (Tay Nguyen) and Thailand. They are also known to occur in Kalimantan (Borneo) and Myanmar; their presence is uncertain in Bali, Sarawak, China, Laos and they are feared to have gone extinct in (if they were present in) Bangladesh, Brunei and India. Domesticated banteng occur in Bali and many eastern Indonesian islands (such as Sulawesi, Sumbawa, and Sumba), Australia, Malaysia and New Guinea. Feral populations are found in East Kalimantan, the Northern Territory in Australia, and possibly in Enggano and Sangihe in Indonesia.

In the past banteng were widespread in the Southeast Asian mainland, including Yunnan Province (China) and extending to Borneo and Java through Peninsular Malaysia; northeastern India and Bali were probably part of the range. Some researchers have excluded Bali from the historical range in the absence of fossil evidence, considering banteng to be an introduced species. However, in East Kalimantan cave art portraying a bovid, dating back to c. 10,000 BC, has been suggested by some to be a depiction of banteng and led to speculation that the species might have reached up to the Wallace Line by that time. Dutch naturalist Andries Hoogerwerf notes that banteng possibly occurred since prehistoric times in Java, as indicated by remains dating back to c. 1,000 BC discovered in the Sampung cave in Ponorogo Regency, Central Java.

== Interaction with humans ==
Human association with banteng could date back several millennia, as suggested by animal remains and art discovered in caves. Hooijer opined that the earliest reference to the banteng was made by the Welsh naturalist Thomas Pennant in his 1800 account Outlines of the Globe, where he mentions a record of "wild oxen, of a reddish brown colour, with vast horns, and of a great size" in Java. However, Hoogerwerf pointed out that the banteng may have been mentioned in literature as old as the Nagarakretagama (1365 AD), a eulogy to the Javanese king Hayam Wuruk, which includes a description of a royal hunt of several animals including banteng. Moreover, records from the 18th century show that banteng were used as beasts of burden to carry several items such as coffee plants.

=== Domestication and uses ===
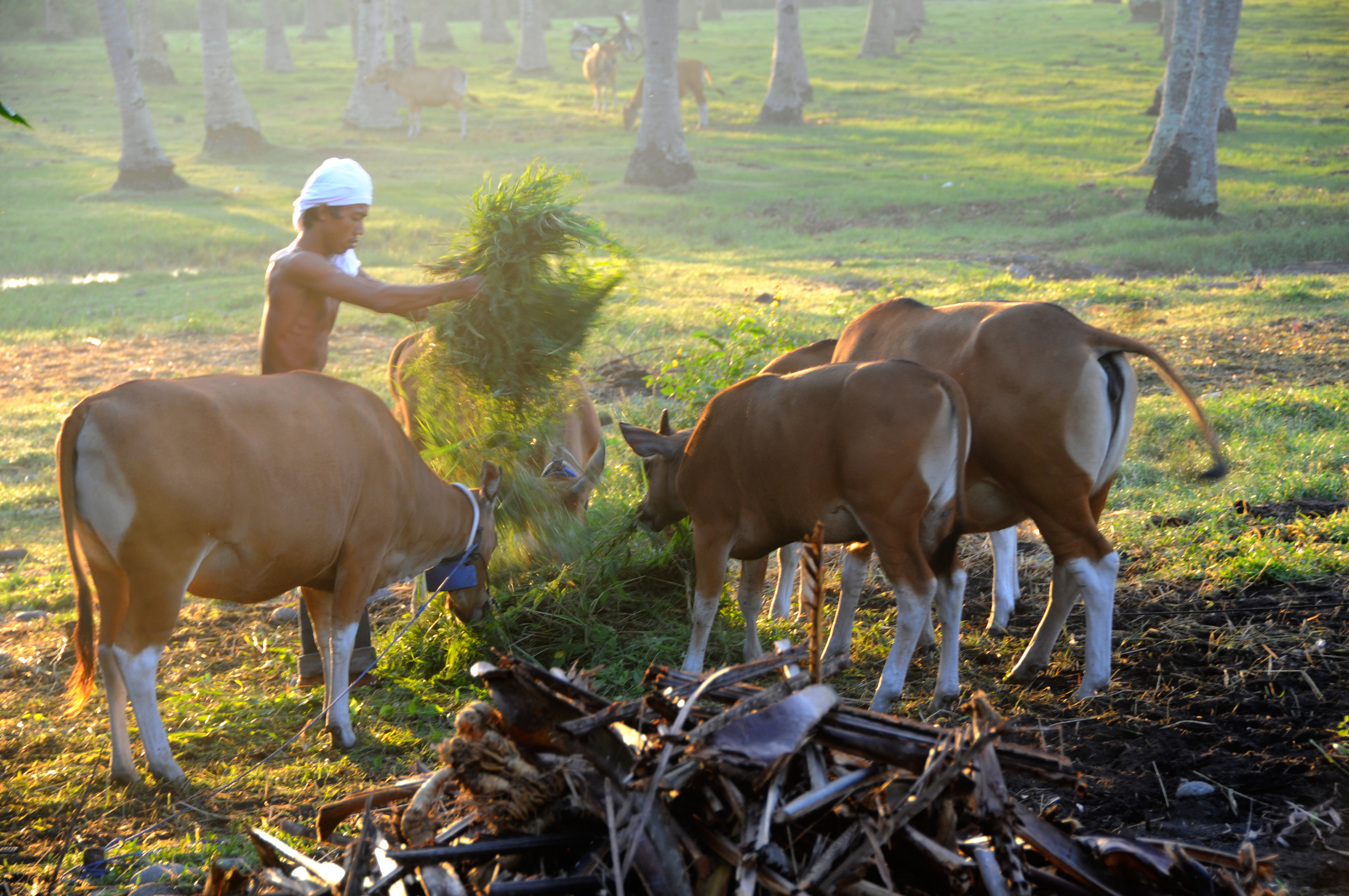
An Indonesian man feeding his Bali cattle

The banteng was domesticated in Indonesian islands of Java or Bali probably around 3,500 BC. The domesticated population consists of mainly the Bali cattle in Indonesia. As of 2016, Bali cattle comprise nearly 25% of the Indonesian cattle population (2.45 million out of the total 9.8 million). Domesticated banteng are docile and can tolerate hot, humid weather. Moreover, they can thrive and maintain their normal body weights even on poor quality fodder. They are primarily used for their highly demanded meat, that has been described as lean and soft. They are also used as draught animals to a limited extent; banteng are reportedly less efficient than zebu in dragging carts on roads, though they are suitable for agricultural work. However, banteng produce little milk; they lactate for only six to ten months, and the daily produce is just 0.9–2.8 kg (2.0–6.2 lb). They are also vulnerable to diseases such as bovine malignant catarrhal fever. In 1964, an outbreak of an unidentified disease, locally known as "jembrana", wiped out 10–60% of domesticated banteng populations in several areas in Bali; similar but less intense outbreaks have continued in the following years. The disease was later determined to be caused by a lentivirus.

==== In Australia ====
Domesticated banteng were first introduced to Australia in 1849 with the establishment of a British military outpost called Port Essington on Cobourg Peninsula. Twenty animals were taken to the western Arnhem Land, in present-day Northern Territory, as a source of meat. A year after the outpost's establishment, poor conditions including crop failure and tropical disease led to its abandonment. On the departure of British troops, the banteng were released from their grazing pastures and allowed to form a feral population. By the 1960s, researchers realised that a population of about 1,500 individuals had developed in the tropical forests of Cobourg Peninsula. As of 2007, around 8,000–10,000 feral banteng occur in Australia, mainly in Garig Gunak Barlu National Park (Cobourg Peninsula, Northern Territory). In a survey published in 1990, the population density in the forests was found to be around 70/km^{2} (180/sq mi), close to that on their initial introduction 140 years ago.

Australian banteng are considered a non-native vermin species, as they reportedly trample and destroy vegetation cover by overgrazing, and sometimes harm and kill people who may closely approach them. Moreover, banteng can transmit lethal diseases such as brucellosis to humans as well as other cattle. As such banteng are occasionally shot to bring down their numbers in Australia, but some have expressed concern about their conservation given the decline in banteng populations outside the country. In a study in the monsoon forests of Garig Gunak Barlu National Park, banteng were found to cause little damage by overgrazing, especially when compared with feral pigs in the region. Instead, grazing by banteng possibly minimises potential dry grass build-up, thus limiting encroachment of seasonal fires (hence postfire grassland) into monsoonal forest areas, and this may help with the dispersal and germination of seeds.

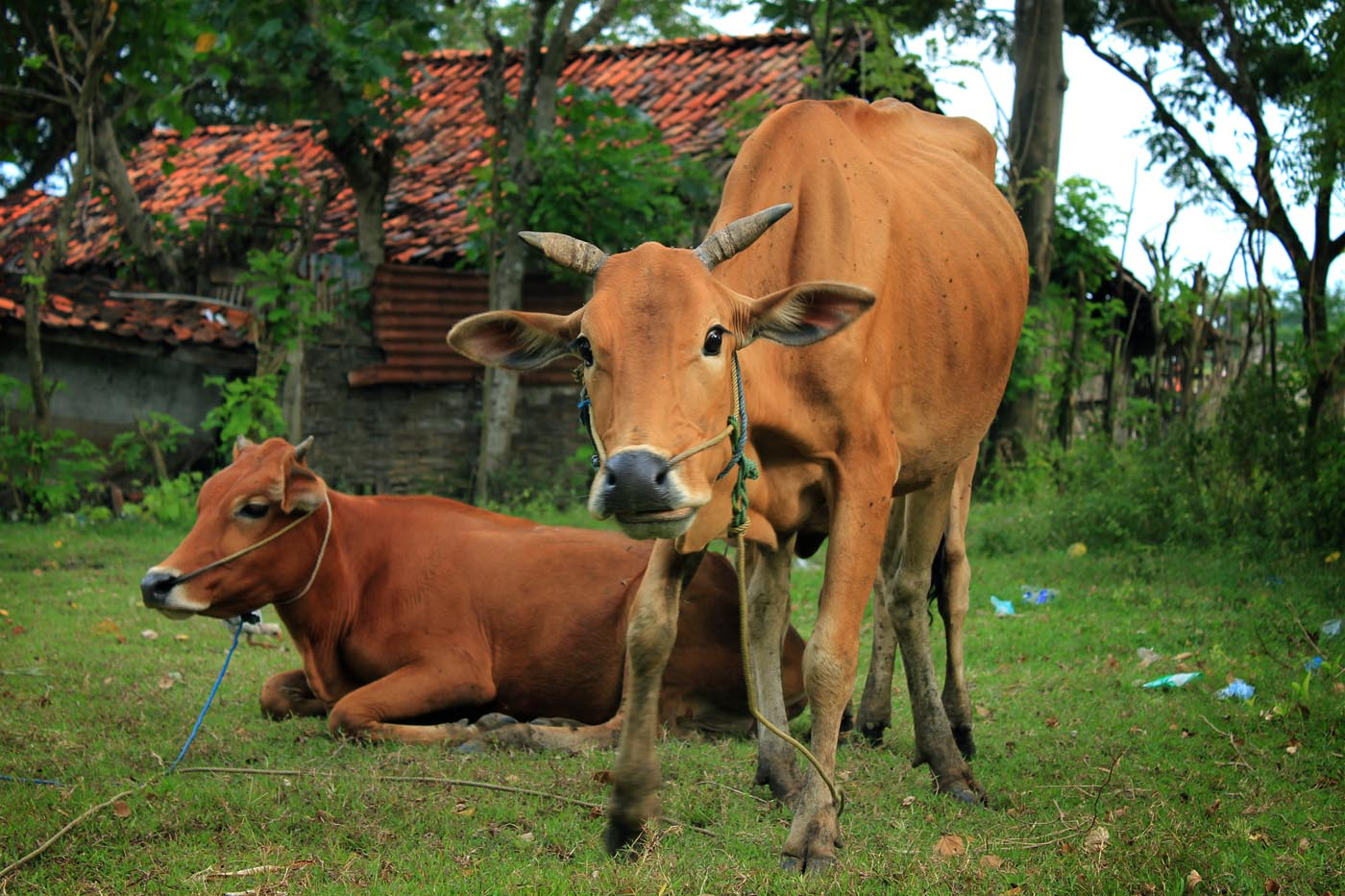
A pair of Madura cattle

==== Hybrids ====
Domesticated banteng have been hybridised with other types of cattle. Madura cattle, found in Java, are fertile hybrids of banteng and zebu. A small breed, the bulls weigh between 250 and 300 kg (550 and 660 lb) and the cows weigh 150 kg (330 lb). They are used in local traditional events such as bull racing and cow beauty contests. Other hybrids include Donggala, Galekan and Java Brebes (Jabres) cattle. While all hybrids with zebu are fertile, the male hybrids resulting from a cross with taurine cattle are sterile. A program to cross-breed domestic and wild banteng began in June 2011, resulting in five pregnancies. This was intended to help improve the quality and productivity of the domesticated breed. The wild bulls were transported from the Baluran National Park in Situbondo.

=== As symbol ===
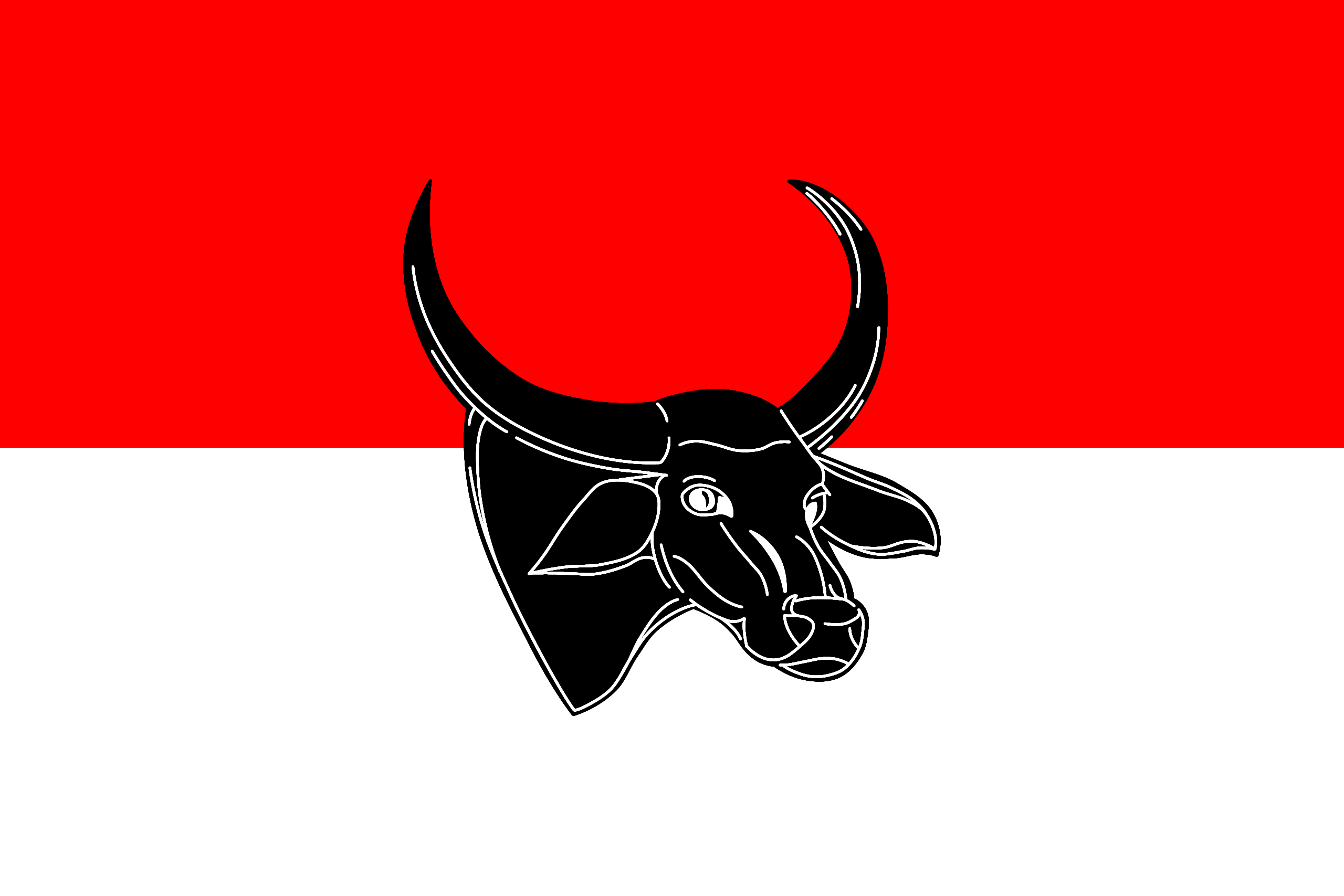
Flag of Perhimpoenan Indonesia in the 1920s

The shield of Indonesian national emblem, with the banteng's head in top-left

Certain elements in the Indonesian independent movements proposed it to be part of the Indonesian flag before the 1939 decision in favour of the plain red-and-white flag.

The banteng's head appears as one of the five emblems in the shield of Indonesia's coat-of-arms, "Garuda Pancasila". The emblem appears on the top-left of the shield, representing the fourth principle of the Indonesian five-point state philosophy (Pancasila), "Democracy that is Guided by the Inner Wisdom in the Unanimity Arising Out of Deliberations Amongst Representatives". A number of political parties in the country used the banteng's head as its symbol, including the Indonesian National Party (of President Sukarno), the Indonesian Democratic Party, and the Indonesian Democratic Party of Struggle (of Presidents Megawati Sukarnoputri and Joko Widodo).

=== Threats and conservation ===
The wild banteng is classified as Critically Endangered on the IUCN Red List, and populations have decreased by more than 50% in the past few decades. In 2008, the IUCN estimated the global banteng population at 5,000–8,000 individuals. Rampant poaching (for food, game, traditional medicine and horns), habitat loss and fragmentation and susceptibility to disease are major threats throughout the range. Most populations throughout the range are small and isolated. Banteng are legally protected in all countries in their range, and are largely restricted to protected areas.

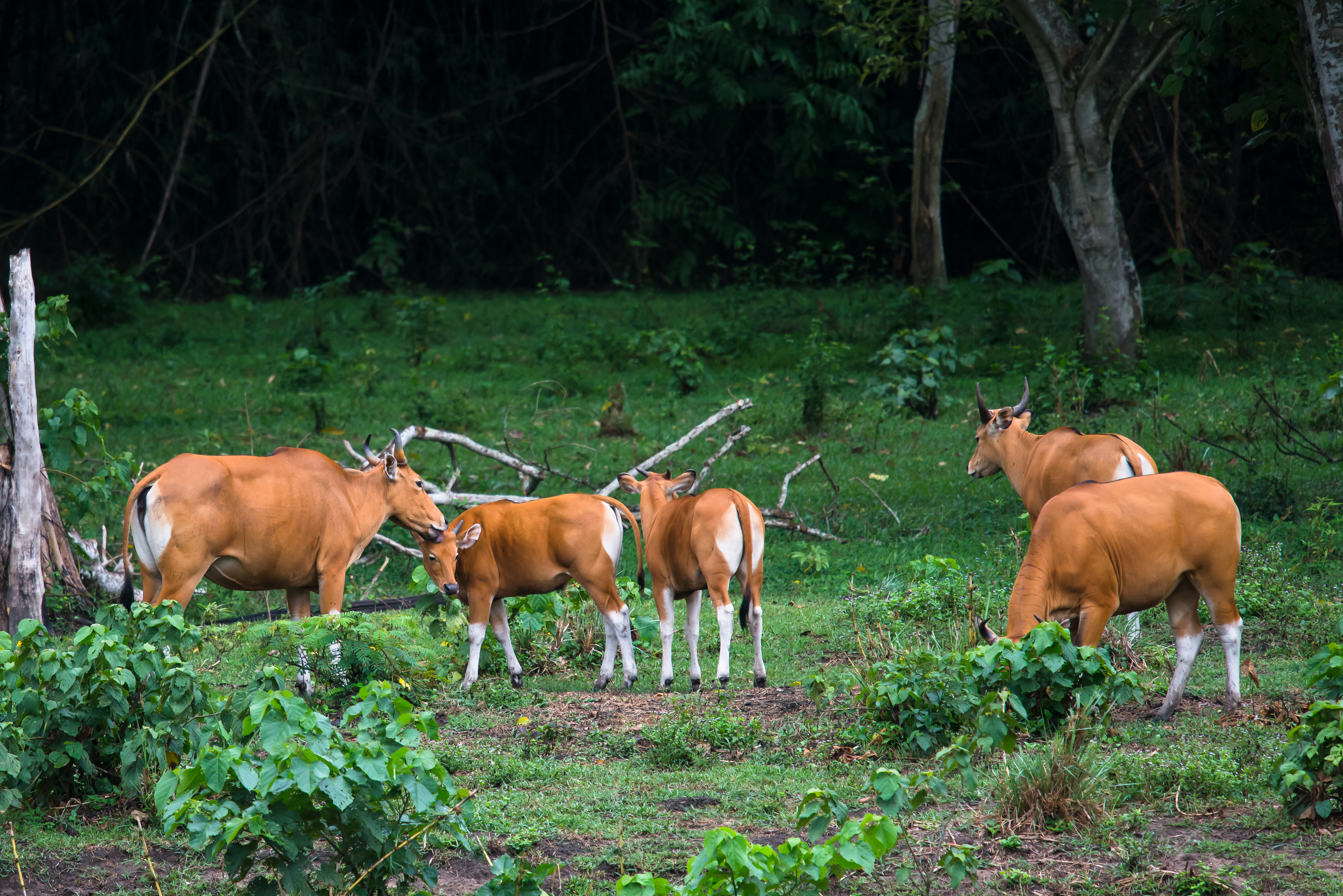
A herd in the Huai Kha Khaeng Wildlife Sanctuary (Thailand)

Most other populations are small and fragmented, and many are on the decline. Surveys in eastern Cambodia between 2009 and 2011 estimated the total population in Sre Pok Wildlife Sanctuary and Phnom Prich Wildlife Sanctuary at 1,980–5,170 individuals. Surveys in the following years (up to 2016) in these sanctuaries and adjacent areas (such as the Keo Seima Wildlife Sanctuary) gave an approximate total of 4,600 individuals. Recent updates to these surveys suggest widespread collapse of these populations. The Keo Seima Wildlife Sanctuary population is estimated in have decline rapididly from 382 in 2010, with too few recorded in 2020 to produce a population estimate. Populations in Sre Pok Wildlife Sanctuary and Phnom Prich Wildlife Sanctuary have declined from around 1000 in each site in 2010 to only 370 and 485 respectively in 2020.

The only populations of more than 50 individuals in Thailand occur in the Huai Kha Khaeng Wildlife Sanctuary and possibly in the Kaeng Krachan National Park. A survey between 2000 and 2003 in Java identified four to five significant populations, with the highest numbers in the Ujung Kulon National Park (300–800 individuals), the Baluran National Park (206 individuals) and the Meru Betiri National Park (200 individuals). In East Java, a survey between 2011 and 2013 recorded rapid decline in populations in the Baluran National Park, though the numbers appeared to be stable in the Meru Betiri National Park; the researchers identified poaching, habitat disturbance, competition with other species, changes in vegetation cover and habitat loss as major threats. In Borneo numbers have fallen in areas like Kalimantan and Sabah, mainly due to poaching and human disturbance. The steepest decline (by more than 50%) took place between 1970 and 2000 due to deforestation and conversion of forests into plantations. Minor populations have been reported from areas such as Kulamba Wildlife Reserve, Deramakot Forest Reserve and Sipitang Forest Reserve during 2009–2015; individuals might still occur in the Belantikan Hulu region (Central Kalimantan), Kayan Mentarang National Park (North Kalimantan) and Kutai National Park (East Kalimantan).

Areas suitable for the conservation of banteng have been identified in Cambodia and Thailand. However, the areas identified thus far are small and fragmented, and more than half of them are outside of protected areas. Though unprotected, these areas could still be very useful as wildlife corridors for connecting otherwise fragmented populations of banteng. These corridors would serve to mitigate some of the harmful impacts of habitat fragmentation, such as the diminished biodiversity, inbreeding, and decreased genetic diversity that often occur in isolated populations. Monitoring and maintenance of habitat quality, law enforcement, and management of human–wildlife conflicts are needed in these areas to ensure the long-term survival of this species.

==== Threats to domesticated banteng ====
Since a small founder event occurred in Australia with the introduction of only 20 previously domesticated banteng, a genetic bottleneck has inevitably occurred, causing all banteng presently in Australia to lack genetic diversity as a result of inbreeding. Genetic invariability can lead to inbreeding depression, resulting in harmful mutations and reduced immunity to diseases. This was proven by an analysis of 12 microsatellites, that recorded a high inbreeding coefficient of 0.58. Despite the limited genetic pool of this population, conservationists hope that populations at risk can be preserved. Some have proposed that a deliberate introduction of the endangered populations to the stable but non-native Australian variety would enable viable conservation, though how it would affect Northern Territory grazing ranges is unknown.

Another possible threat is introgression with other cattle and similar bovids throughout their range where they coexist in the wild or due to crossbreeding programs, that may compromise the genetic integrity or purity of banteng populations. This, coupled with possibly low genetic diversity in small, isolated populations, is a major concern in Sabah, where water buffaloes might crossbreed with wild banteng. However, little genetic research has been done in this area to conclusively establish the impact of such crossbreeding on banteng survival. In a bid to protect the genetic purity of Bali cattle, Bali has banned other cattle varieties on the island.

==== Cloning ====
The banteng is the second endangered species to be successfully cloned, and the first clone to survive beyond infancy (the first was a gaur that died two days after birth). Scientists at Advanced Cell Technology in Worcester, Massachusetts extracted DNA from skin cells of a dead male banteng, that were preserved in the San Diego Zoo's cryobank Frozen Zoo facility, and transferred it into eggs from domestic banteng cows, a process called somatic cell nuclear transfer. Thirty embryos were created and sent to Trans Ova Genetics, where they were implanted in domestic banteng cows. Two were carried to term and delivered by Caesarian section. The first was born on 1 April 2003, and the second two days later. The second was euthanised, apparently suffering from large offspring syndrome (an overgrowth disorder), but the first survived and lived for seven years at the San Diego Zoo, where it died in April 2010 after it broke a leg and was euthanised.
