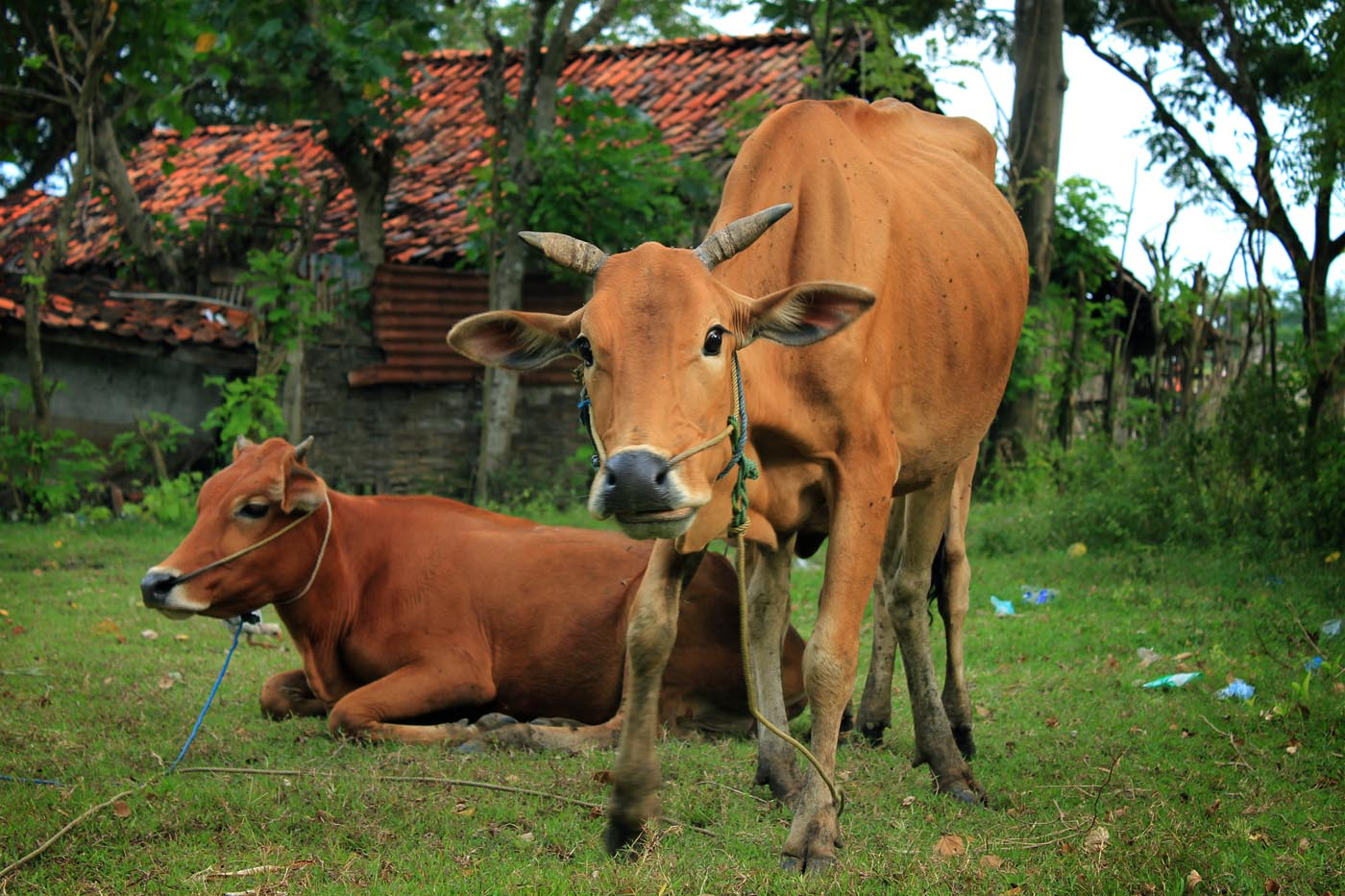

Scientific classification
- Kingdom: Animalia
- Phylum: Chordata
- Class: Mammalia
- Order: Artiodactyla
- Family: Bovidae
- Subfamily: Bovinae
- Subtribe: Bovina
- Genus: Bos
- Species: B. indicus × B. javanicus

= Madura cattle =

Breed of cattle

Madura cattle, also known as Maduran cattle or Madurese cattle (Indonesian: Sapi madura, Madurese: Sapè Madhurâ) are a stable, inbred hybrid of zebu (Bos indicus) and banteng (Bos javanicus). They originated from the island of Madura just northeast of Java, in Indonesia where the original cattle population was the wild banteng, very similar to Balinese cattle.

The Sinhala cattle, a zebu breed from Sri Lanka, were introduced more than 1500 years ago, and the crossbreeds between the two was found to be better in body size than either of the original breeds. Some sources say the zebu component was Ongole cattle from India. The coloration is reddish brown with non-specific white patterning on the back and rump. They are a small breed, bulls having a mature weight of 250 to 300 kg, it is used for racing by the locals and are sometimes called the dancing cattle. In 2002 the population was estimated by the FAO at 900,000. Efforts are being made to conserve the breed on Sapudi island.

== Madurese bull racing ==
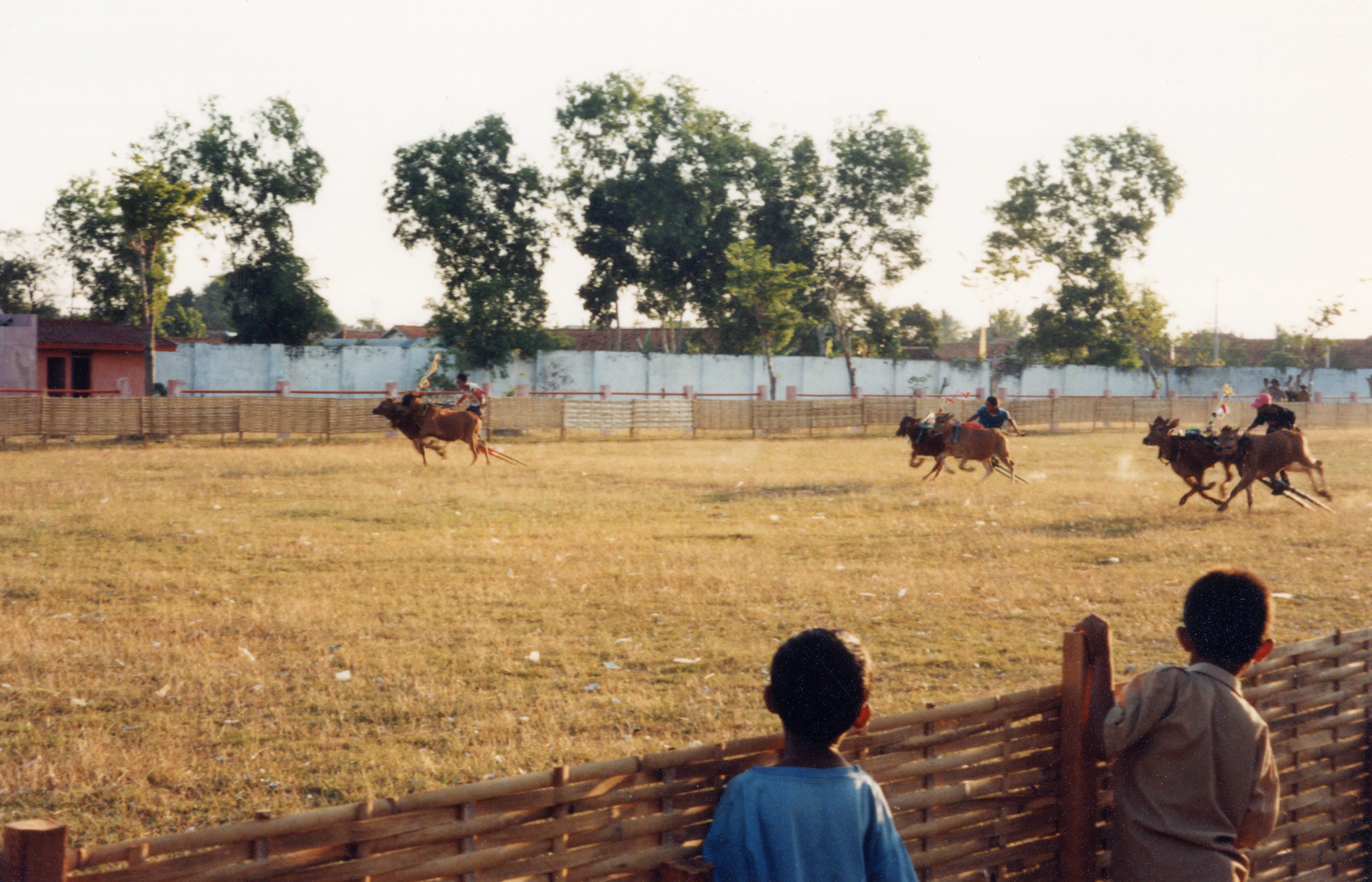
Bull racing (karapan sapi) in Giling Stadium, Sumenep.

In bull racing two bulls are yoked together, pulling a small sled on which the driver attempts to balance over a hundred-metre course. The bulls participating in the event are adorned with gold and other decorations, and the event is sometimes accompanied by gamelan music, food, and wagers on the outcome of the race. A depiction of the festival was featured on the reverse of the 100-rupiah coin for Indonesia from 1991 to 1998.

== Sonok cattle contest ==
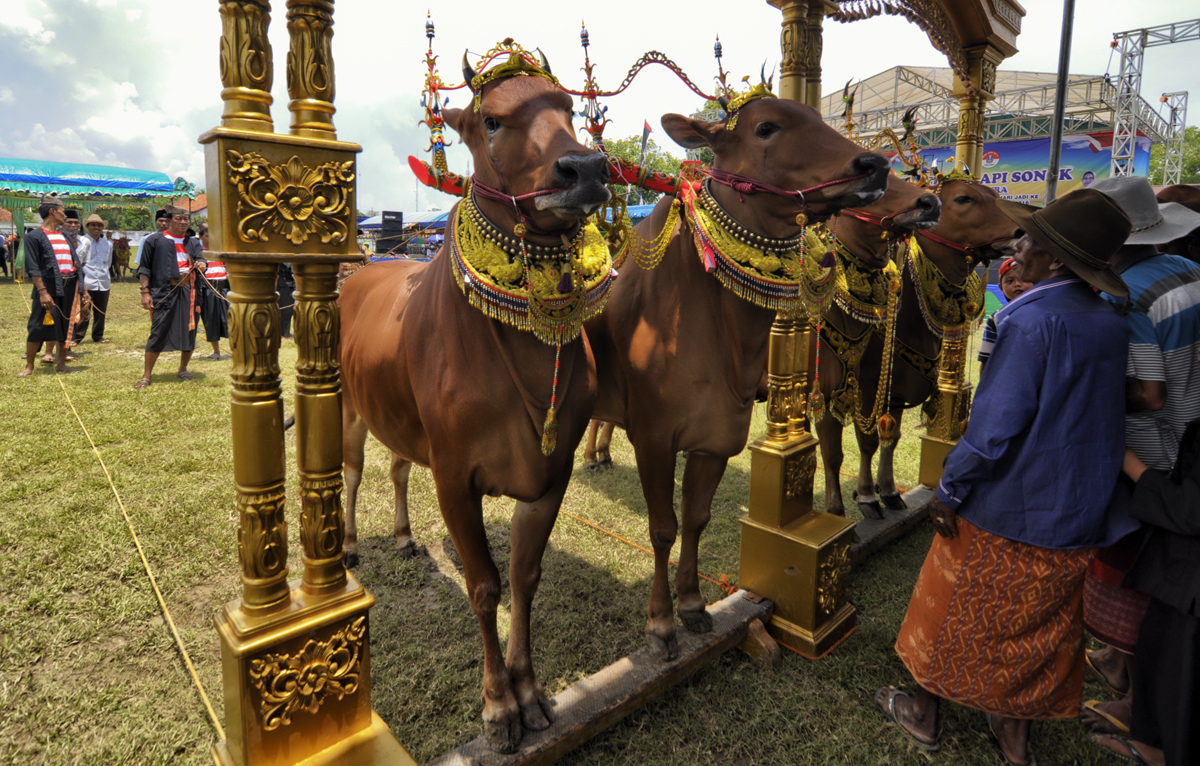
Sonok cattles, a local cattle contest from Madura island.

Sonok cattle are a type of female Madura cattle, concentrated on Madura Island. These cattle have special value for the culture and ceremonial events of the Madurese people due to the excellent exterior beauty appearance, which are determined during a contest for a pair of female Madura cattle to walk with a compact step. Observation and assessment of the Sonok cattle by judges was done in 1 to 2 m distant from the front, side and back sites to determine the winner.
