= Yakalo =

Conservation status
- Domesticated

Scientific classification
- Kingdom: Animalia
- Phylum: Chordata
- Class: Mammalia
- Order: Artiodactyla
- Family: Bovidae
- Subfamily: Bovinae
- Tribe: Bovini
- Subtribe: Bovina
- Hybrid: Bos grunniens × Bison bison

Hybrid of yak and American bison

The yakalo is a cross of the yak (Bos grunniens) and the American bison (Bison bison, known as a buffalo in North America). It was produced by hybridisation experiments in the 1920s, when crosses were made between yak bulls and both pure bison cows and bison–cattle hybrid cows. As with many other inter-specific crosses, only female hybrids were found to be fertile (Haldane's rule). Few of the hybrids survived, and the experiments were discontinued in 1928.

== See also ==
- Beefalo
- Dzo
- Żubroń
