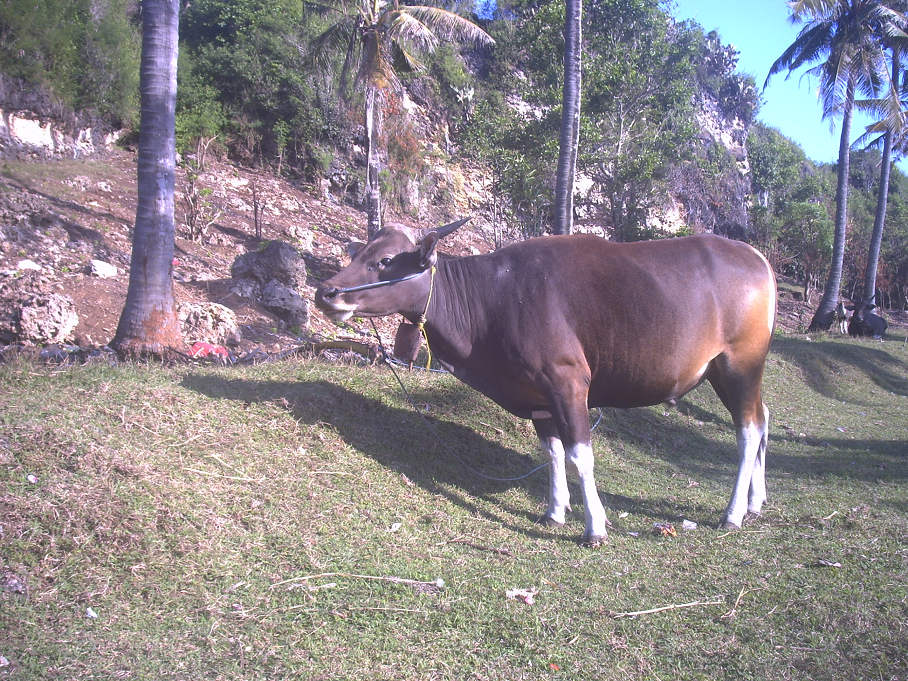

Conservation status
- Domesticated

Scientific classification
- Kingdom: Animalia
- Phylum: Chordata
- Class: Mammalia
- Order: Artiodactyla
- Family: Bovidae
- Subfamily: Bovinae
- Genus: Bos
- Species: B. domesticus

Binomial name
- Bos domesticus Wilckens, 1905

Synonyms
- Bibos domesticus; Bos javanicus domesticus; Bibos javanicus domesticus

= Bali cattle =

Domestic species of cattle

The Bali cattle (Bos domesticus), also known as Balinese cattle, Bali banteng, Indonesian cattle, or most generally, the domestic banteng are a domesticated species of bovine which originated from the banteng (Bos javanicus). Bali cattle are an important source of meat and are used for plowing. They are thought to have originated in Bali. Feral populations exist in Northern Australia.

== History and range ==
The Bali cattle are one of the few species of true cattle that did not descend from the extinct aurochs. Their domestication occurred around 3500 BC, originating from banteng.

Bali cattle have been introduced to East Timor, Java, Malaysia, New Guinea, the Philippines and Australia as livestock, and account for about one fourth of the total cattle population of Indonesia. In eastern islands, they account for up to four-fifths of the cattle. In the Northern Territory of Australia, they have escaped from captivity and roam in large herds damaging crops.

== Characteristics ==
Bali cattle have a hump, a white rump patch, white stockings, and white extending under the belly. Females are reddish-yellow, and males are reddish brown, turning to a dark brown with maturity. Compared to banteng, Bali cattle are smaller, demonstrate less obvious sexual dimorphism, have smaller horns, and have less developed withers. Body weights of males average from 335 to 363 kilograms, while females average from 211 kilograms to 242 kilograms.

Bali cattle are noted for their remarkable ability to grow on low-quality fodder and their high fertility.

== Husbandry ==
The temperament of the Bali cattle is timid and deer-like, making them suitable for plowing rice paddy fields, but their hooves are too soft to pull cargo on paved roads. Mechanization and urbanization are making the cattle redundant as draft animals, however.

Meat from young Bali cattle is noted for being exceptionally tender.

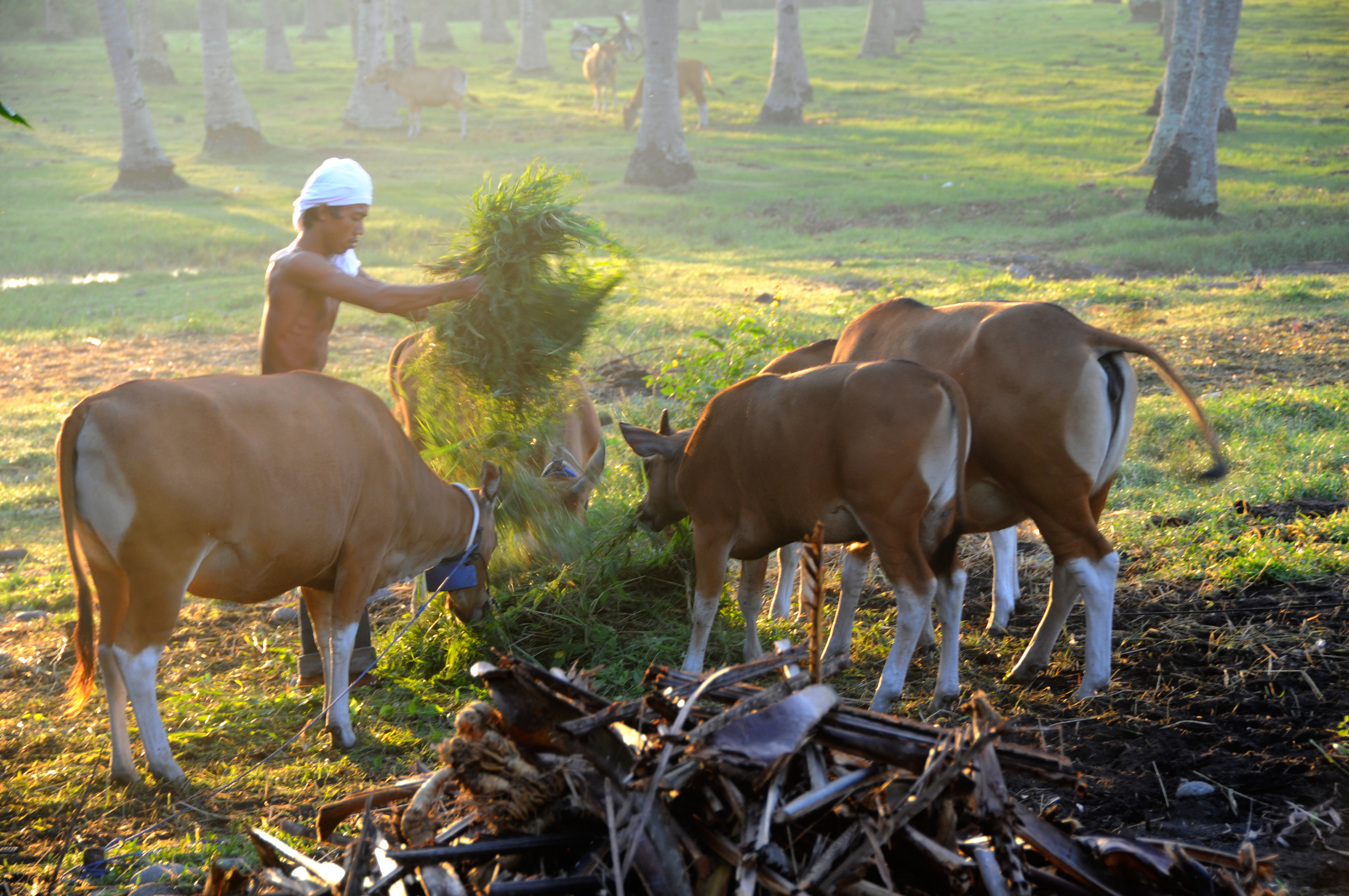
A man feeding his Bali cows

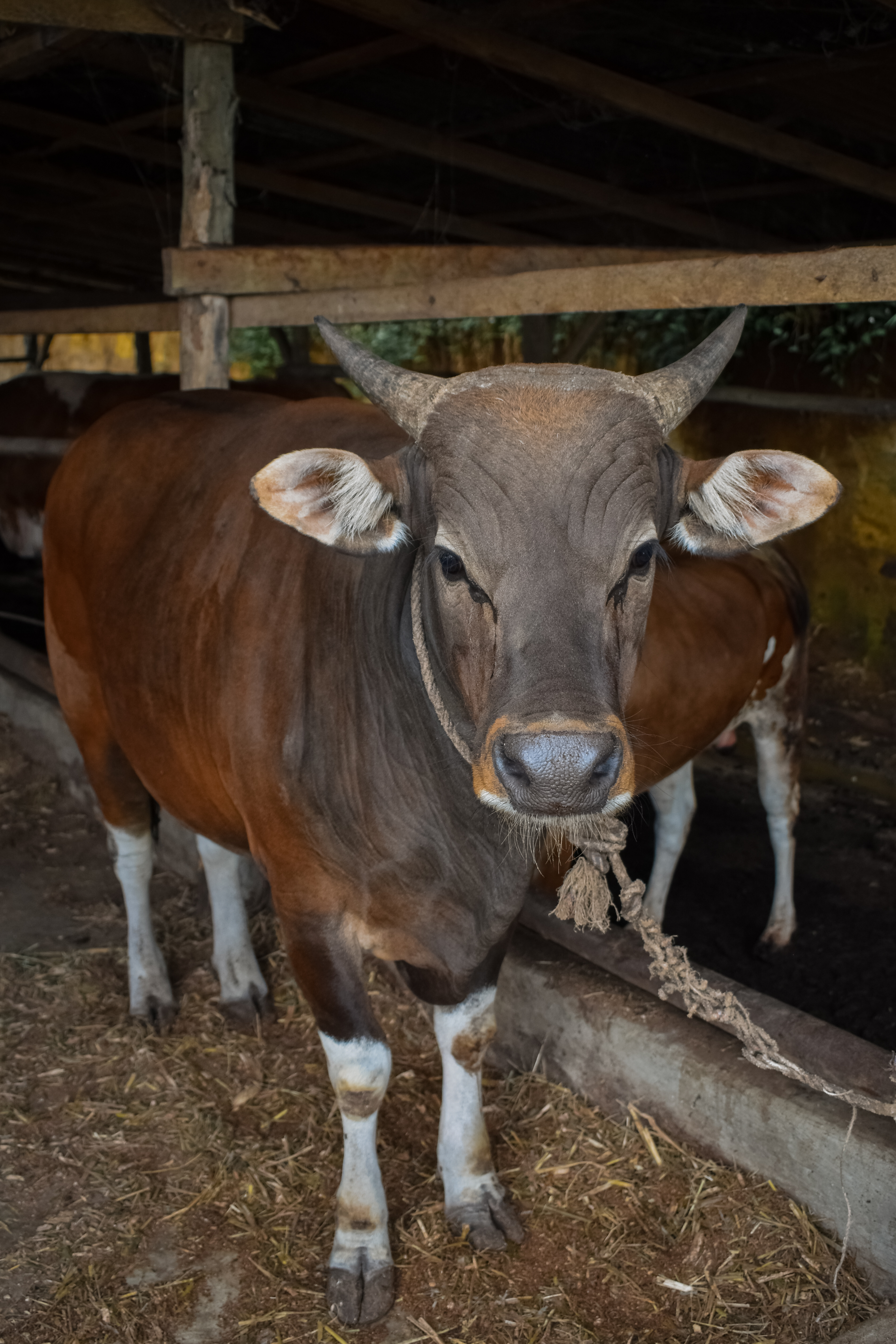
A Bali bull in Indonesia

Problems with the livestock include small birth and weaning weights, high calf mortality rates, slow growth rates, and low milk production.

=== Breeding ===
Artificial insemination was first introduced to Bali cattle in southern Sulawesi and Timor in 1975 and 1976. It has been performed in Bali since the 1980s with semen from the National Artificial Insemination Centre of Singosari, and semen has been produced and distributed by the Artificial Insemination Centre of the Bali Province since 2001.

== Disease ==
Domestic banteng are noted for their high resistance to most diseases. However, they are susceptible to malignant catarrhal. The cattle are also very susceptible to Jembrana disease, which was first described in the cattle in 1964.

== Conservation ==
The population of Bali cattle has been declining in most places, due to greater consumption of the cattle than local capacity to supply. In recent years, there have been calls to increase the population of domestic banteng. Ronny Rachman Noor from Bogor Agricultural Institute has charged that the Indonesian government has undervalued the cattle simply because they were local, and that national policies must be enacted to optimally preserve the cattle.

The Indonesian government has understood the need to explore new strategies to improve the low productivity of Bali banteng and address concerns relating to husbandry and nutrition, but this adoption has been historically slow.
