= Kulamba Wildlife Reserve =

- Location within East Malaysia
- Location: Sabah, Malaysia
- Coordinates: 5°30′14″N 118°40′26″E
- Area: 204 km^{2} (79 sq mi)

The Kulamba Wildlife Reserve is situated in Sabah, Malaysia, and covers 204 km^{2} (79 sq mi). It is an area protected under state law and is particularly significant for the conservation of orangutans.

== See also ==
- Geography of Malaysia
