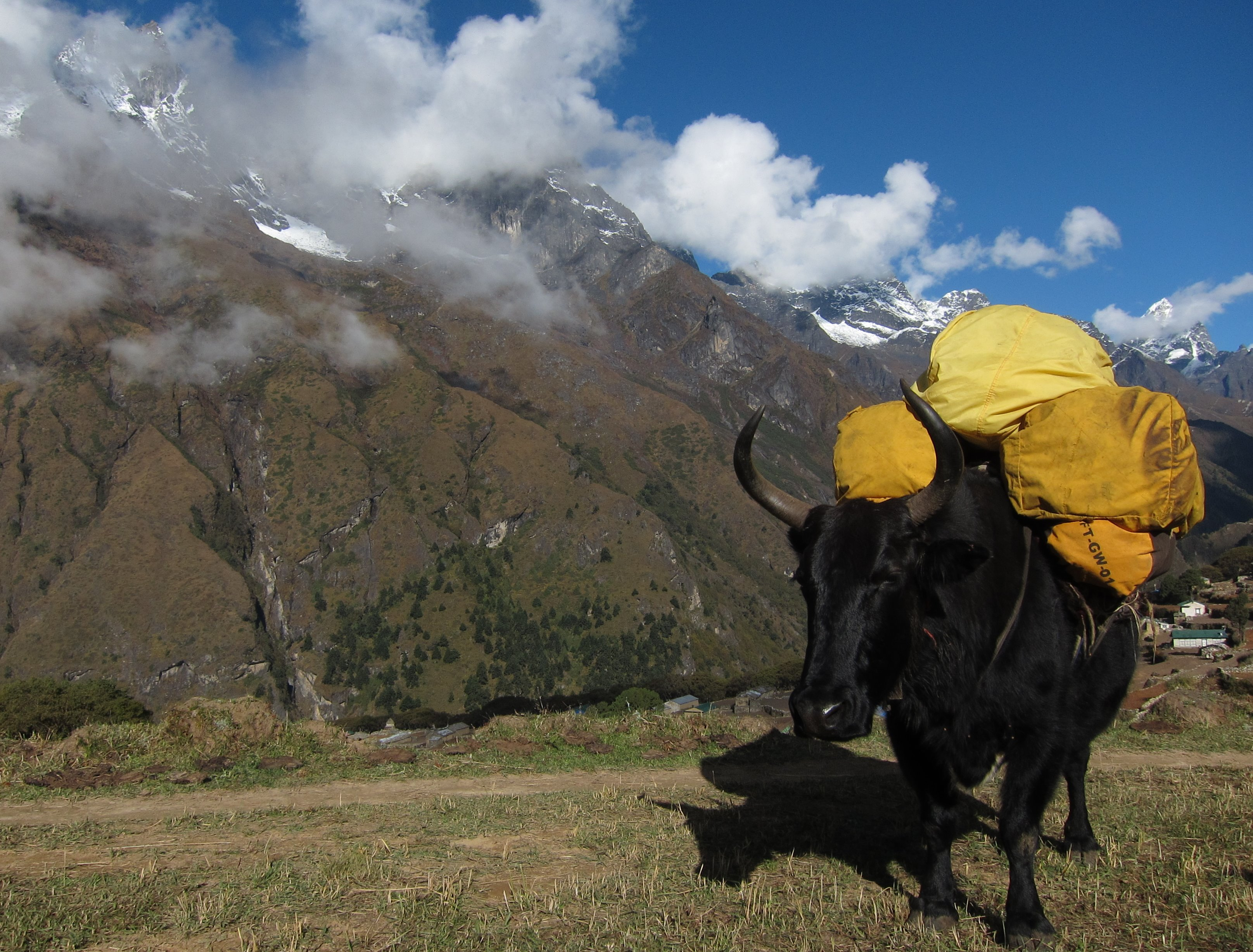
- A dzo acting as a pack animal en route to Mount Everest

Conservation status
- Domesticated

Scientific classification
- Kingdom: Animalia
- Phylum: Chordata
- Class: Mammalia
- Order: Artiodactyla
- Family: Bovidae
- Subfamily: Bovinae
- Subtribe: Bovina
- Genus: Bos
- Species: B. grunniens × B. taurus

= Dzo =

Hybrid between the yak and domestic cattle

A dzo (Standard Tibetan: མཛོ་, romanized: mdzo) is a hybrid between the yak and the domestic cow. The word dzo technically refers to a male hybrid, while a female is known as a dzomo or zhom. In Mongolian, it is called a khainag (хайнаг). There is also the English portmanteau term of yattle—a combination of the words yak and cattle, as well as yakow—a combination of the words yak and cow.

Dzomo are fertile (or fecund), while dzo are sterile. As they are a product of the hybrid genetic phenomenon of heterosis (hybrid vigor), they are larger and stronger than yak or cattle from the region. In Mongolia and Tibet, khainags are thought to be more productive than cattle or yaks in terms of both milk and meat production.

Dzomo can be back crossed. As a result, many supposedly pure yak or pure cattle probably carry each other's genetic material. In Mongolia, the result of a khainag crossed with either a domestic bull or yak bull is called ortoom (ортоом, three-quarter-bred) and an ortoom crossed with a domestic bull or yak bull results in a usan güzee (усан гүзээ, one-eighth-bred).

Dzos inherit two distinct protein types, one from each parent, leading to alterations in their mitochondrial structure and function. Consequently, this adaptation significantly enhances the dzo's capacity to thrive at higher altitudes compared to either parent.
