= List of genetic hybrids =

This is a list of hybrids which is limited to well documented cases of animals of differing species able to create hybrid offspring which may or may not be infertile.

Hybrids should not be confused with genetic chimeras, such as that between sheep and goat known as the geep. Wider interspecific hybrids can be made via in vitro fertilization or somatic hybridization; however, the results of the cells are not able to develop into a full organism.

== Nomenclature ==
The naming of hybrid animals depends on the sex and species of the parents. The father giving the first half of his species' name and the mother the second half of hers. (e.g. a pizzly bear has a polar bear father and grizzly bear mother whereas a grolar bear's parents would be reversed.)

== Cartilaginous fish ==
- Order Carcharhiniformes
  - Family Carcharhinidae
    - Genus Carcharhinus
      - A group of about 50 hybrids between Australian blacktip shark and the larger common blacktip shark was found by Australia's East Coast in 2012. This is the only known case of hybridization in sharks.

== Ray-finned fish ==
- Order Acipenseriformes
  - In 2020 hybrids were announced from different families of fish, American paddlefish (Polyodon spathula) and Russian sturgeon (Acipenser gueldenstaedtii). Accidentally created by Hungarian scientists, they are dubbed "sturddlefish".
- Order Cichliformes
  - Family Cichlidae
    - Blood parrot cichlid, which is probably created by breeding a redhead cichlid and a Midas cichlid (Amphilophus citrinellus) or red devil cichlid (Amphilophus labiatus). It was bred in 1986 in Taiwan.
    - Flowerhorn cichlid, a fertile hybrid that was created in 1993 by breeding a red devil cichlid and a three spot cichlid.
- Order Perciformes
  - Family Centrarchidae
    - Subfamily Lepominae
      - Genus Lepomis
        - Greengill sunfish, a hybrid between a bluegill (Lepomis macrochirus) and green sunfish (Lepomis cyanellus).
        - Pumpkinseed x bluegill sunfish, a hybrid between a pumpkinseed (Lepomis gibbosus) and a bluegill (Lepomis macrochirus).

== Amphibians ==
=== Salamanders ===
- In 2007 hybrids of a California tiger salamander and a barred tiger salamander were discovered to be able to survive easier than their parent species.
- Japanese giant salamander and Chinese giant salamander have created hybrids that threaten the survival of Japanese giant salamanders because of competition for similar resources in Japan.

== Reptiles ==
- Order Squamata
  - Suborder Anguimorpha
    - Family Varanidae
      - Genus Varanus
        - Subgenus Varanus
          - Hybrid between Varanus panoptes horni and Varanus gouldii flavirufus.
  - Superfamily Lacertoidea
    - Family Teiidae
      - Hybrid between Aspidoscelis exsanguis and Aspidoscelis inornatus.
  - Infraorder Alethinophidia
    - Family Pythonidae
      - Hybrids between the yellow ball python and the woma python.
      - Hybrids between the ball python and the Borneo short-tailed python.
      - The hybrid Borneo bat eater, between a Burmese python and reticulated python, can be further hybridized with another reticulated python.
      - Hybrids between Ball python and reticulated python.
      - Genus Python
        - Around 2018, 13 hybrids of Burmese pythons (Python bivittatus) and Indian pythons (Python molurus) among 400 invasive Burmese pythons studied in South Florida were found by the United States Geological Survey.
    - Family Boidae
      - Hybrids between Columbian boa and yellow anaconda.
      - Genus Corallus
        - Hybrid between emerald tree boa and Amazon tree boa.
    - Family Colubridae
      - A fertile cross between a king snake and a corn snake. One example is a cross between a California kingsnake and a corn snake called the "jungle corn snake".
      - Genus Lampropeltis
        - A fertile cross between a California kingsnake and Pueblan milk snake is called an "imperial Pueblan milk snake".
        - A fertile cross between a California kingsnake and whitesided black rat snake (Pantherophis obsoletus).
        - A fertile cross between an imperial Pueblan milk snake and Honduran milk snake.
- Infraorder Gekkota
  - Family Diplodactylidae
    - Hybrid of chahoua gecko and crested gecko.

=== Crocodilians ===
- Hybridization between the endemic Cuban crocodile (Crocodylus rhombifer) and the widely distributed American crocodile (Crocodylus acutus) is causing conservation problems for the former species as a threat to its genetic integrity.
- Saltwater crocodiles (Crocodylus porosus) have mated with Siamese crocodiles (Crocodylus siamensis) in captivity producing offspring which in a number of cases have grown over 20 feet (6.1 metres) in length. It is likely that wild hybridization occurred historically in parts of southeast Asia.

=== Turtles ===
- Superfamily Chelonioidea
  - Family Cheloniidae
    - A hybrid between a hawksbill sea turtle (Eretmochelys imbricata) and loggerhead sea turtle (Caretta caretta).
- Superfamily Testudinoidea
  - Family Testudinidae
    - A hybrid between a sulcata tortoise (Centrochelys sulcata) and leopard tortoise (Stigmochelys pardalis).
  - Family Emydidae
    - Hybrid between red-eared slider (Trachemys scripta elegans) and Ouachita map turtle (Graptemys ouachitensis).
    - The hybrid between a red-eared slider (T. scripta elegans) and a yellow-bellied slider (T. scripta scripta).

== Mammals ==
=== Marsupials ===
- Macropod hybrids of various combinations have been reported.

=== Odd-toed ungulates ===
- Hybrids between black and white rhinoceroses have been recognized.

==== Equines ====
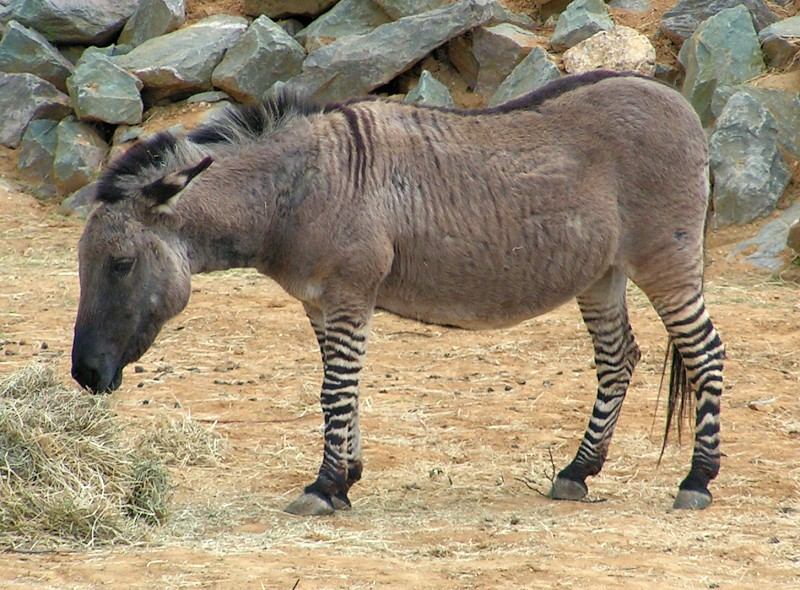
A "zonkey", a zebra/donkey hybrid

- Horses can breed with Przewalski's horse to produce fertile hybrids, with 65 chromosomes.
- Mule, a cross of female horse and a male donkey.
- Hinny, a cross between a female donkey and a male horse. Mules and hinnies are examples of reciprocal hybrids.
- Kunga, a cross between a donkey and a Syrian wild ass.
- Zebroids
  - Zeedonk or zonkey, a zebra/donkey cross.
  - Zorse, a zebra/horse cross
  - Zony or zetland, a zebra/pony cross ("zony" is a generic term; "zetland" is specifically a hybrid of the Shetland pony breed with a zebra)
  - Natural hybrids between Grévy's, mountain and plains zebras occur in the wild, particularly in central Kenya where their ranges overlap, sometimes resulting from a scarcity of mates for the endangered Grévy's species. These fertile hybrids often display behaviors intermediate between the three species, such as increased vigilance and altered herd social structures. Hybridization of these can pose a conservation risk to endangered species like the Grévy's zebra, as it can lead to genetic dilution.

=== Even-toed ungulates ===
- Wild boars have been hybridized with pigs to produce Iron Age pigs and the Mangalica.

==== Bovids ====
- Dzo, zo or yakow; a cross between a domestic cow/bull and a yak.
- Beefalo, a cross of an American bison and a domestic cow. This is a fertile breed; this, along with mitochondrial DNA evidence, has led bison to occasionally be classified in the genus Bos.
- Żubroń, a hybrid between wisent (European bison) and domestic cow.
- Yakalo, a hybrid between a bison and a yak.
- Fertile hybrids between bongos (Tragelaphus eurycerus) and sitatungas (Tragelaphus spekii) have occurred in captivity.
- Hybrids between other antelope species, including gazelles, such as the blackbuck and goitered gazelle, have also occurred.
- Hybrids between the African buffalo subspecies, the Lake Chad buffalo and African forest buffalo can occur on forest/savannah margins.
- Wild water buffalo and domestic water buffalo can hybridize freely.
- Hybrids between wild and domestic yaks.
- Banteng, Bali cattle, gayal and gaur have been known to hybridize with each other and with domestic cattle.
- Madura cattle, hybrids of zebu and banteng.

==== Caprids ====
- Hybrids between mouflon and sheep, are referred to as Corsican sheep.
- Sheep-goat hybrids, such as the toast of Botswana.
- Hybrids between Barbary sheep (Ammotragus lervia), also called aoudads, and domestic goats, have been produced. Hybridization of Barbary sheep and goats have produced live, fertile female hybrids (often with 57 chromosomes), and these hybrids can even backcross with rams.
- Hybrids between Alpine ibexes and wild and domestic goats.

==== Camelids ====
- Cama, a cross between a male dromedary and a female llama, also an intergeneric hybrid.
- Dromedary and Bactrian camels can crossbreed and produce a one large-humped Hybrid camel.
- Huarizo, a cross between a male llama and a female alpaca.

==== Cetaceans ====
- Family Balaenopteridae
  - Hybrids between blue (Balaenoptera musculus) and fin whales (Balaenoptera physalus) have been recorded.
  - At least one hybrids between a blue whale (Balaenoptera musculus) and a humpback whale (Megaptera novaeangliae) was attributed to marine biologist Michael Poole.
- Family Delphinidae
  - Wholphin, a fertile but rare cross between a false killer whale and a bottlenose dolphin.
  - In 2014, DNA analysis showed the clymene dolphin (Stenella clymene) to be a naturally occurring hybrid species descended from the spinner dolphin (Stenella longirostris) and the striped dolphin (Stenella coeruleoalba).
- Family Monodontidae
  - In 2019, a "narluga" hybrid of a male beluga (Delphinapterus leucas) and a female narwhal (Monodon monoceros) was confirmed by DNA analysis.

=== Carnivorans ===
- Ursid hybrids, such as the grizzly-polar bear hybrid, occur between all species except for the giant panda.
- Polecat–ferret hybrids and polecat–mink hybrids.

==== Felids ====
- Pumapard, a hybrid between a cougar and a leopard.
- Subfamily Felinae
  - Savannah cats are the hybrid cross between an African serval cat and a domestic cat
  - Bengal cat, a cross between the Asian leopard cat and the domestic cat, one of multiple hybrids between the domestic cat and wild cat species. The domestic cat, African wildcat and European wildcat may be considered variant populations of the same species (Felis silvestris), making such crosses non-hybrids.
  - Serengeti, a hybrid crossbreed of a Bengal and an Oriental Shorthair.
  - Chausie, a hybrid between a jungle cat and domestic cat.
  - Kellas cat, a hybrid between a Scottish wildcat and domestic cat.
  - Kanaani cat, a hybrid between an African wildcat and domestic cat.
- Subfamily Pantherinae
  - Genus Panthera
    - Ligers and tigons (crosses between a lion and a tiger) and other Panthera hybrids such as the lijagulep.
    - Species P. tigris
      - A hybrid between a Bengal tiger and a Siberian tiger is an example of an intra-specific hybrid.
- Various other wild cat crosses are known involving the lynx, bobcat, leopard, serval, etc.

==== Canids ====
- Fertile canid hybrids occur between coyotes, wolves, red wolves, dingoes, jackals and domestic dogs.
- Hybrids of unknown fertility can occur between South American foxes of the Lycalopex genus and domestic dogs.

=== Primates ===
- Black-and-white ruffed lemurs can hybridize with red ruffed lemurs.

==== Great apes ====
- Genus Pongo
  - Hybrid orangutan, a hybrid between either three of the orangutan species, a Bornean orangutan, Tapanuli orangutan or Sumatran orangutan. Subspecies of Bornean orangutan have interbred in captivity.
- Genus Pan
  - Common chimpanzees had been known to hybridize with bonobos in captivity and rarely in the wild. Chimpanzee subspecies are also known to have crossbred in captivity.
- Genus Homo
  - Interbreeding between archaic and modern humans
  - Humanzee, a hypothetical hybrid between a human and chimpanzee.
  - Humster, a hybrid cell line made from a zona-free hamster oocyte fertilized with human sperm.
- Genus Gorilla
  - Koolakamba, a proposed hybrid of a chimpanzee and gorilla.

=== Proboscideans ===
- At Chester Zoo in the United Kingdom, a cross between an African elephant (male) and an Asian elephant (female). The male calf was named Motty. It died of intestinal infection after ten days.
- African forest elephants and African bush elephants are known to hybridize with each other where their ranges overlap. Evidence shows that they can form hybrid zones where their ranges overlap, particularly in the Democratic Republic of Congo and Uganda. Hybrids have been found to be fertile, and a significant number of elephants in hybrid zones, such as Kibale National Park in Uganda, show intermediate physical characteristics. While the two species were once thought to be reproductively isolated, recent studies have confirmed hybridization is more widespread than previously understood.
- Analysis of nuclear genomes reconstructed from ancient DNA indicates that members of the extinct elephant genus Palaeoloxodon, including the European straight-tusked elephant had significant (>30%) introgressed ancestry from African forest elephants and to a lesser extent mammoths. Genetic evidence suggests that the North American Columbian mammoth was the result of hybrization between two different mammoth populations, with woolly mammoths and Columbian mammoths sometimes hybridizing during the Late Pleistocene in North America.

=== Rodents ===
- Campbell's dwarf hamsters (Phodopus campbelli) have been hybridized with winter white dwarf hamsters (Phodopus sungorus).

== Birds ==
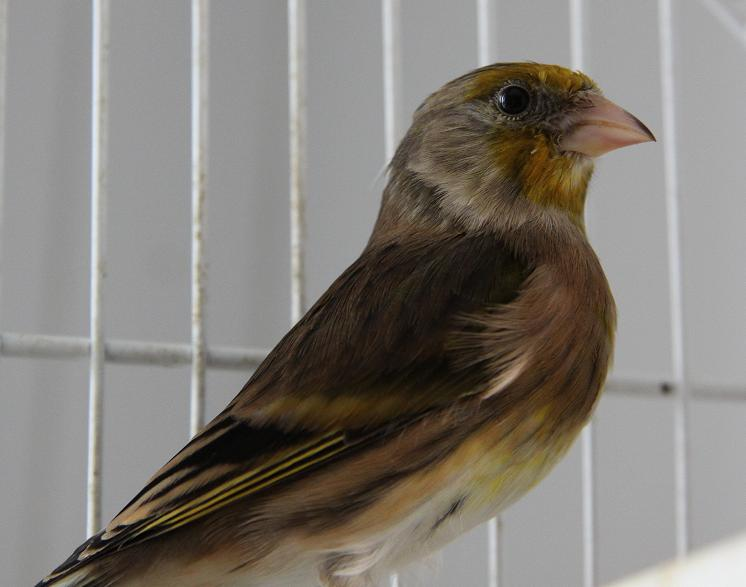
A domestic canary/goldfinch hybrid

- Order Strigiformes
  - Family Strigidae
    - Genus Strix
      - Hybrids between spotted owls and barred owls
- Order Passeriformes
  - The domestic canary (Serinus canaria var. domesticus, family Fringillidae) has hybridized with other perching birds including the blue-black grassquit (Volatinia jacarina, family Thraupidae), the chestnut-capped blackbird (Agelaius ruficapillus, family Icteridae), and the red fody (Foudia madagascariensis, family Ploceidae). Domestic canaries have also been interbred with the red siskin (Spinus cucullatus) to produce the red factor canary. A fertile egg was made from the domestic canary and the chestnut-shouldered petronia (Petronia xanthocollis, family Passeridae) but there has been no mention of hatched hybrids.
  - The red-crested cardinal (Paroaria coronata, family Thraupidae) has hybridized between the northern cardinal (Cardinalia cardinalis, family Cardinalidae), shiny cowbird (Molothrus bonariensis, family Icteridae), and chestnut-capped blackbird.
  - The yellowhammer (Emberiza citrinella, family Emberizidae) has hybridized with the European greenfinch (Carduelis chloris) and the European goldfinch (Carduelis carduelis), both of the family Fringillidae.
  - The cut-throat (Amadina fasciata, family Estrildidae) has hybridized with the Eurasian linnet (Carduelis cannabina, family Fringillidae) and the orange bishop (Euplectes franciscanus, family Ploceidae).
  - The "grue jay," the offspring of a male blue jay (Cyanocitta cristata) and a female green jay (Cyanocorax luxuosus) observed in Texas.
  - Family Fringillidae
    - Cagebird breeders sometimes breed hybrids between species of finch, such as goldfinch x canary. These birds are known as mules.
- Order Psittacidae
  - Subfamily Arinae
    - Tribe Arini
      - Numerous macaw hybrids are also known.
- Order Accipitriformes
  - Family Accipitridae
    - Red kite and black kite: Hybrid events occur quite regularly in mainland Europe, with a hybrid zone existing in Central Europe where the two species ranges overlap. A single mating between a vagrant black kite and a native red kite, producing hatchlings which successfully fledged, was recorded in Scotland in 2006. Female F1 hybrids show reduced fertility.
    - Red-shouldered hawk (Buteo lineatus) and common black hawk (Buteogallus anthracinus): one and possibly two offspring produced naturally in Sonoma County, California, US.
- Order Falconiformes
  - Family Falconidae
    - Genus Falco
      - Hybrids between gyrfalcons and sakers are known
- Order Anseriformes
  - Family Anatidae
    - The mulard duck, hybrid of the domestic Pekin duck and domesticated Muscovy ducks.
    - Brewer's duck, hybrid of the mallard and gadwall.
    - Genus Anas
      - In Australia, New Zealand and other areas where the Pacific black duck occurs, it is hybridised by the much more aggressive introduced mallard. This is a concern to wildlife authorities throughout the affected area, as it is seen as genetic pollution of the black duck gene pool.
    - Hybrids between Greylag goose (Anser anser) and Canada goose (Branta canadensis).
- Order Galliformes
  - Gamebird hybrids, hybrids between gamebirds and domestic fowl, including chickens, guineafowl and peafowl, interfamilial hybrids.
  - Family Phasianidae
    - Genus Tetrao
      - Western capercaillies are known to hybridise occasionally with black grouse (these hybrids being known by the German name rackelhahn) and the closely related black-billed capercaillie.

== Arthropods ==
- Different species of brine shrimp in the genus Artemia have been bred with each other to create the Sea-Monkeys.
- The Asian termite and Formosan termite are an invasive hybrid in Florida.
- European honey bees have been crossed with the African subspecies to produce Africanized bees.
- The white admiral (Limenitis arthemis) and the viceroy (Limenitis archippus) can breed with each other and produce a hybrid known as a rubidus
- Bombyx hybrid, a hybrid between a wild silk moth (Bombyx mandarina) and a domestic silk moth (Bombyx mori).
- Colias eurytheme and C. philodice butterflies have enough genetic compatibility to produce viable hybrid offspring. Hybrid speciation may have produced Heliconius butterflies, but that is disputed.
- A hybrid is produced by a pipevine swallowtail (Battus philenor) mating with a goldrim swallowtail (Battus polydamas). As the ranges of these two species overlap, the hybrid can be encountered in nature.

== Plants ==
- Triticale, a grain crop, came from a cross of wheat (Triticum) and rye (Secale)
- In 1994, a hybrid was made between longan (Dimocarpus longana) and lychee (Litchi chinensis)
- A list of plants that can hybridize under the same genus (Interspecific introgression, allopolyploid origin, and interspecific hybrid origin) can be found here: List of plant hybrids
