= Polecat =

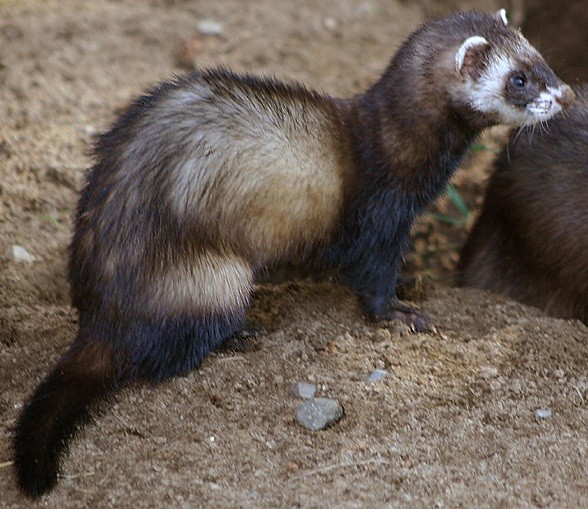
European polecat

Polecat is a common name for several cat-like mustelid species in the subfamilies Ictonychinae and Mustelinae. Polecats do not form a single taxonomic rank (i.e. clade). The name is applied to several species with broad similarities to European polecats, such as having a dark mask-like marking across the face.

In the United States, the term polecat is sometimes applied to the black-footed ferret, a native member of the Mustelinae. In Southern United States dialect, the term polecat is sometimes used as a colloquial nickname for the skunk, which is part of the family Mephitidae.

== Greek mythology ==
The polecat, in accordance with Greek mythology, is one of the symbols that represents Hekate along with two torches. The polecat was one of Hekate's animal familiars.

It represents Hekate for two reasons, one being that Galinthias, the nurse of Alkmene was turned into a polecat and Hekate took pity on her. The other reason is that Gale the Witch was turned into a polecat as punishment by Hekate.

In ancient times, polecats were often kept as pets in peoples homes in order to hunt pests.

== Habitat ==
Common habitats, females live by ponds or farms, males have a higher interest in living by ponds or riparian vegetation during the breeding season. They are found living in lowland, grassland, farmland, and riparian habitats.

== Diet ==
Polecats are carnivorous animals. Researchers have found there are differing diets based on the habitat the polecat loves. In the Mediterranean, they usually eat rabbits, whereas they eat more amphibians in Switzerland and Poland. Polecats commonly eat rabbits in Britain. They also commonly eat rodents, such as rats and voles during the winter. Their various habitats can help to allow their foraging habits to increase.

== Behavior ==
Polecats express 'ritual aggression' during breeding season, when they find unfamiliar polecats in the area of their home. Male polecats are found to be much more aggressive than female polecats. There have also been evidence of aggression between male and female polecats, when the male polecats begin to get violent and attack female polecats if they do not reciprocate their attempts to mate. In this situation, the male will attack and the female will fight, becoming defensive until he backs down.

Polecats also have an influence on other species, for example, the European Polecat can impact agile frogs (Roma dalmatina) through predation. Polecats would have selective predation toward the male frogs, causing a decrease in the male sex ratio and the opportunity for multiple mating in the frog population.

== Taxonomy ==
According to the most recent taxonomic scheme proposing eight subfamilies within Mustelidae, polecats are classified as:

Subfamily Ictonychinae

- Genus Ictonyx
  - Striped polecat, I. striatus, (native to Central, Southern, and sub-Saharan Africa)
  - Saharan striped polecat, I. libycus (Sahara)
- Genus Vormela
  - Marbled polecat, V. peregusna (Southeastern Europe to western China)

Subfamily Mustelinae

- Genus Mustela
  - Steppe polecat, M. eversmannii (Central and Eastern Europe, and Central Asia)
  - American polecat (Black-footed ferret) M. nigripes (Southwest United States)
  - European polecat, M. putorius (Western Eurasia and North Africa)

- Mustelidae
  - - - - - - Lutrinae
            - Mustela, Neogale (subfamily Mustelinae)
          - Galictis, Vormela, Ictonyx, Poecilogale (subfamily Ictonychinae)
        - Melogale (subfamily Helictidinae)
      - - Eira, Gulo, Martes (subfamily Guloninae)
        - Arctonyx, Meles (subfamily Melinae)
    - Mellivora (subfamily Mellivorinae)
  - Taxidea (subfamily Taxideinae)

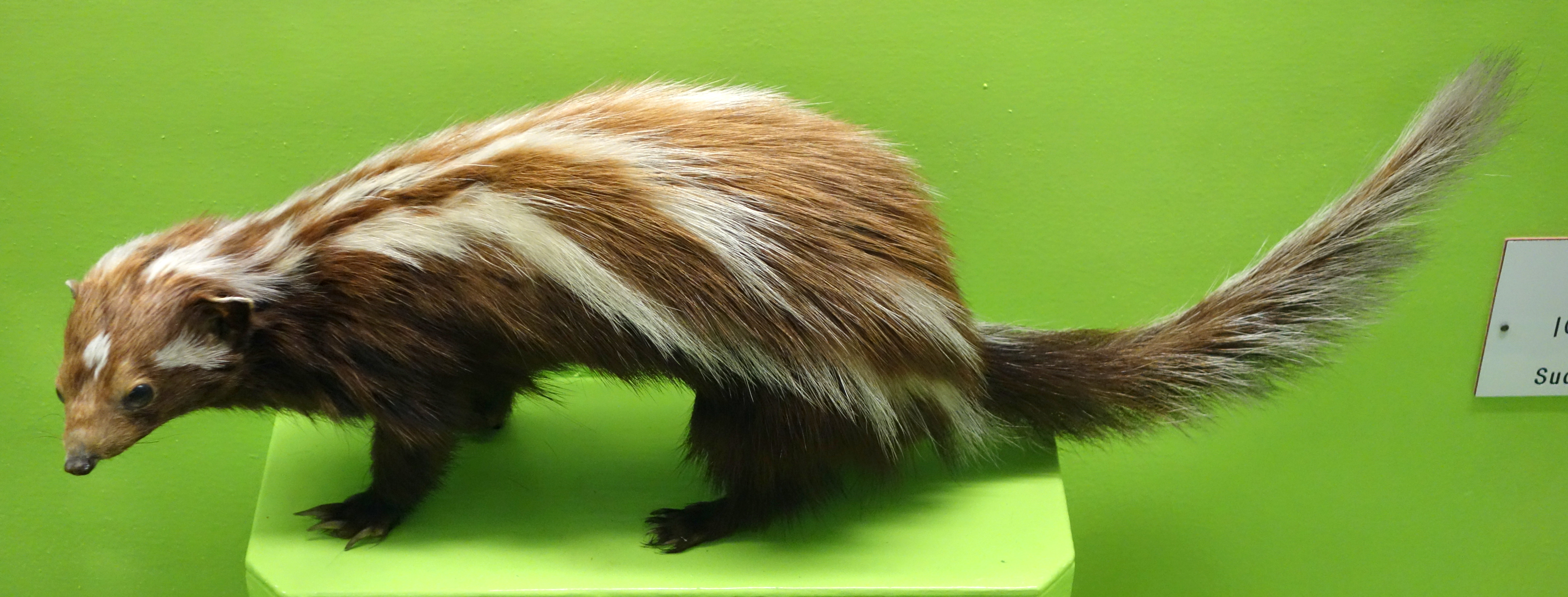
Striped polecat

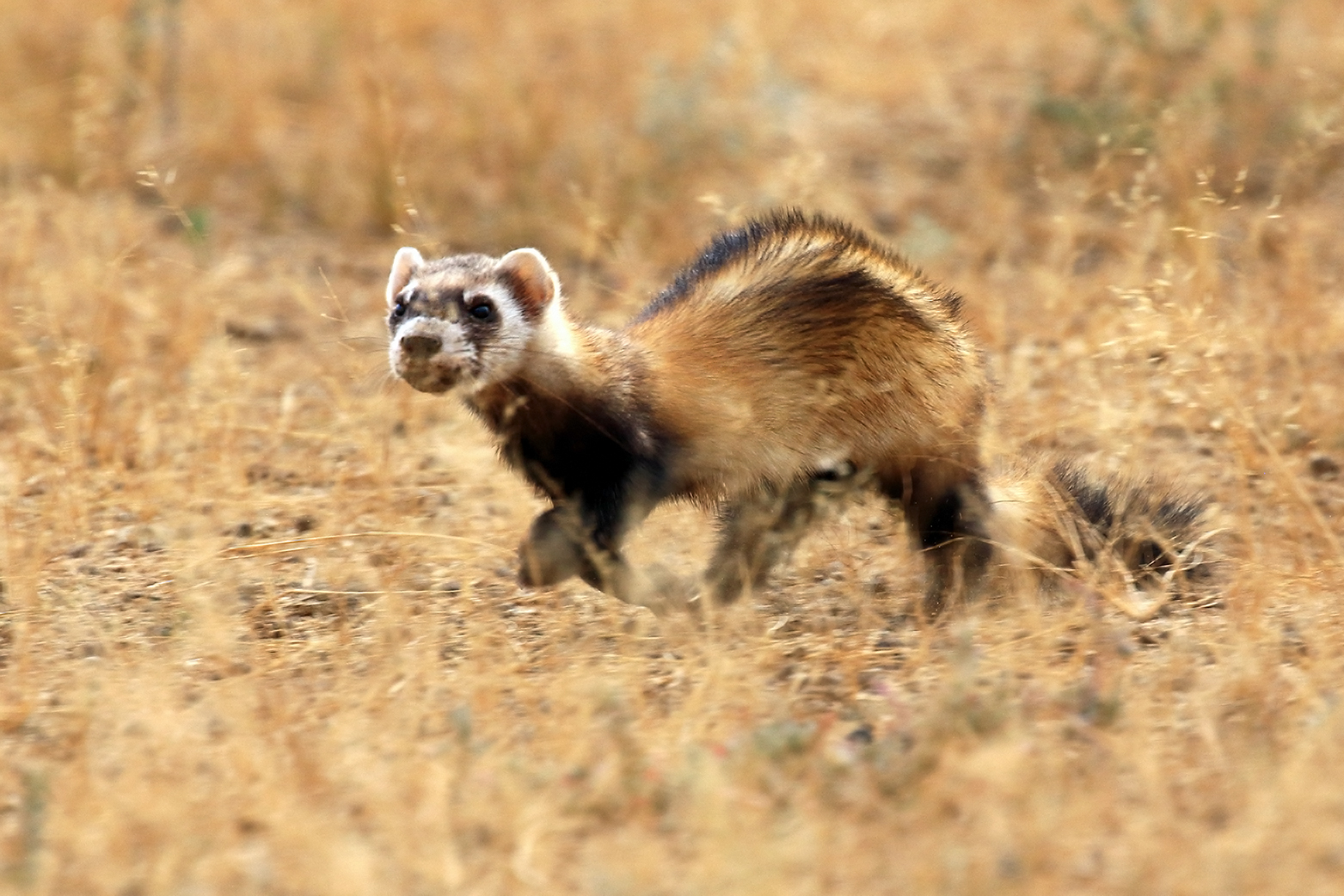
Steppe polecat

Black-footed ferret, the "American polecat"

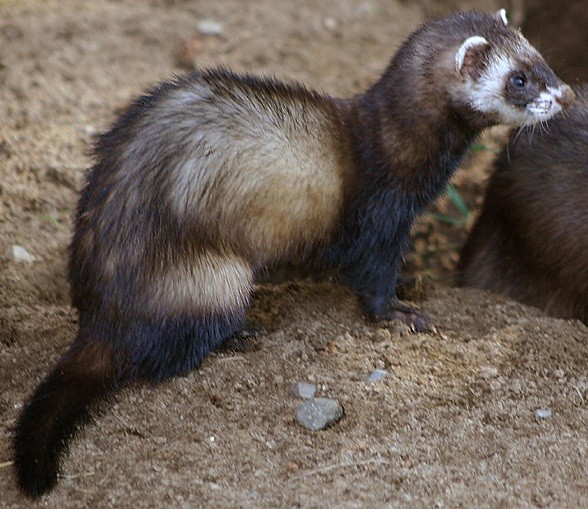
European polecat

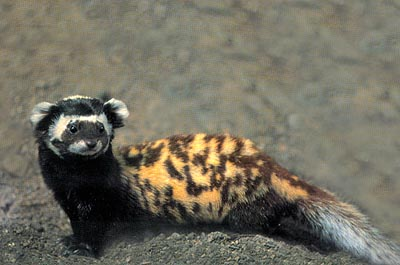
Marbled polecat

== See also ==
- Polecat–mink hybrid
- Polecat–ferret hybrid
