= Polecat Hollow =

Valley in Missouri, United States

Coordinates: 36.8714426°N 91.1504084°W

Polecat Hollow is a valley in Carter County in the U.S. state of Missouri.

Polecat Hollow was named for the polecats native to the area.
