= Hamster zona-free ovum test =

Method of testing human sperm viability

- Purpose: to diagnose male infertility

The hamster zona-free ovum test (HZFO test), or hamster egg-penetration test, or sometimes just hamster test, is an in-vitro test used to study physiological profile of spermatozoa. The primary application of the test is to diagnose male infertility caused by sperm unable to penetrate the ova. The test has limited value, due to expense and a high false negative rate.

The procedure was developed in the 1970s after researchers noticed that removal of the zona pellucida from a hamster egg allowed it to become "promiscuous" and be penetrated by sperm of other species.

== Procedure ==
In this test, sperm are incubated with several hamster eggs. After seven to twenty hours, the number of sperm penetrations per egg is measured. The hamster eggs have had the zona pellucida, the outer membrane, removed—hence, zona-free.

Having all eggs penetrated by multiple sperm is considered to be a positive sign for fertility. Results suggest that men whose sperm fail the hamster test are a third as fertile than those whose sperm pass.

Although medical professionals often present the procedure as unable to create an embryo, these claims are not technically correct. If the human sperm succeeds in penetrating the hamster egg, a hybrid embryo is indeed created, known as a humster. These embryos are typically destroyed before they divide into two cells; were they left alone to divide, they would still be unviable.

== Legal permit ==
The practice is made licensable in the United Kingdom by the Human Fertilisation and Embryology Act 1990.

== Use ==
The hamster zona-free ovum test was frequently performed by sperm banks when screening potential sperm donors. It was particularly useful in assessing the extent to which sperm from a potential donor could penetrate cervical mucus when artificial insemination was principally performed by ICI or IVI, rather than by IUI. It may still be used when the sperm of a donor is intended to be used in IVF procedures because it can illustrate the ease by which the sperm can penetrate the egg. However, owing to the unreliability of these tests and the advancement of computer tests for the screening of sperm, tests by sperm banks using these methods largely fell out of favour during the 1990s.

== Significance ==
Donated sperm and intracytoplasmic sperm injection techniques are considered more strongly for those whose sperm fail this test.

This test evaluates the acrosome reaction of human spermatozoa. However, the incidence of acrosome reaction in freely swimming human sperm does not accurately reflect the fertilizing ability of the sperm.

This test has a poor predictive value for the success of fertilization in IVF treatment at any insemination concentration. No strong correlation has been found between hamster egg penetration rates and the various semen parameters and the role of the hamster egg penetration test in the investigation of the causes of infertility should be evaluated further. However, a negative result on the hamster test correlates with a lower probability of the man's partner becoming pregnant.

== See also ==
- Kurzrock–Miller test
- Postcoital test
- Sperm–cervical mucus contact test
