= Postcoital test =

Test used for the evaluation of infertility

- Synonyms: Sims-Huhner test
- Purpose: test of infertility

The postcoital test (PCT), also known as the Sims test, Hühner test , Sims–Hühner test, or cervical mucous penetration assay is a test in the evaluation of infertility. The test examines interaction between sperm and mucus of the cervix. The PCT examines sperm survival in cervical mucus during the pre-ovulatory period and determines whether sperm are migrating into the female reproductive system. It does not predict whether pregnancy can occur. The test is performed 1 to 2 days before ovulation, when estrogen-stimulated cervical mucus is abundant. Basal body temperatures or the midcycle luteinizing hormone surge may be used to determine the timing of the PCT. Mucus is withdrawn from the endocervical canal within 8 hours of coitus and examined. The presence of any forwardly motile sperm in alkaline mucus suggests adequate coital technique and a normal cervical mucus–sperm interaction.

== Procedure ==
The PCT is scheduled close to ovulation when mucus is abundant, and the infertile couple is asked to have sexual intercourse, preferably in early hours of morning. Several hours later (usually 2), the woman is examined by the physician. The mucus is aspirated from cervical canal and spread on a glass slide. Smear from posterior fornix is used as control. 10-50 motile sperms per high power field are considered normal. Rotatory or shaky motion of sperms indicates presence of antispermal antibody. Cervical mucus is examined for quality, viscosity and fern test.

A poor PCT may indicate sperm or mucus problems, including perhaps presence of immune factors that inactivate sperm. Also ovulatory problems and poor coital technique may affect the PCT. The test is useless in presence of cervical infection.

With the application of principles of evidence-based medicine the role of the PCT has been questioned and its use has become controversial.

== History ==
It was apparently first performed by J. Marion Sims and later described by Max Huhner.

== See also ==
- Hamster egg penetration test
- Kurzrock–Miller test
- Sperm-cervical mucus contact test
