= Gale (mythology) =

Witch in Greek mythology

Gale (Ancient Greek: Γαλῆ, romanized: Galê, lit. 'weasel, marten' pronounced [galɛ̌ː]) is a minor character in Greek mythology. She was a very skillful witch who earned the wrath of Hecate, the Greek goddess of magic.

== Mythology ==
According to Aelian's On the Characteristics of Animals, Gale was a talented witch who dealt in herbs and potions. But she was extremely lascivious, and had abnormal sexual desires (which are not described in detail). For this Hecate, the goddess of witchcraft, turned her into a small, "evil" in the words of Aelian, mustelid bearing her name, galê (Greek γαλῆ or γαλέη, a land-marten or polecat).

== Symbolism ==
The myth explains how the marten or polecat became one of the most commonly associated animals with Hecate. Martens/polecats were thought to have magical potency in ancient Greece, though not necessarily of the beneficial kind.

Gale's name shares an etymology with that of Galanthis, another mortal woman who was turned into a mustelid at the hands of an angered goddess, in this case Hera.

== See also ==
- Medea
- Circe
- Pasiphae
- Ariadne
- Selene

== Bibliography ==
- Celoria, Francis (1992). The Metamorphoses of Antoninus Liberalis: A Translation with a Commentary. Routledge. ISBN 0-415-06896-7.
- Claudius Aelianus, On the Characteristics of Animals, translated by Alwyn Faber Scholfield (1884–1969), from Aelian, Characteristics of Animals, published in three volumes by Harvard/Heinemann, Loeb Classical Library, 1958. Online version at the Topos Text Project.
