= Galanthis =

Mythical character

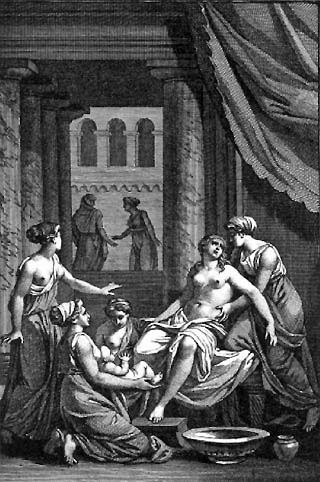
Birth of Heracles by Jean Jacques Francois Le Barbier.

In Greek mythology, Galanthis or Galinthias (Ancient Greek: Γαλανθίς/Γαλινθιάς, romanized: Galanthís/Galinthiás) was the woman who interfered with Hera's plan to hinder the birth of Heracles in favor of Eurystheus, and was changed into a weasel or polecat as punishment for being so insolent as to deceive the goddesses of birth that were acting on Hera's behalf.

== Mythology ==
=== Ovid's account ===
In the version followed by Ovid in Metamorphoses, Galanthis was the red-gold haired servant of Alcmene, who assisted her during the birth of Heracles. When Alcmene was in labor, she was having difficulty giving birth to a child so large. After seven days she called for assistance from Lucina, the goddess of childbirth (that is, the Greek Eileithyia). However, Lucina did not help her due to the wishes of Hera. Instead, she clasped her hands and crossed her legs, preventing the child from being born. Alcmene struggled in pain, cursed the heavens, and became close to death. Galanthis noticed Lucina and deduced Hera's plans. She told the goddess that the baby was born; this so startled her that she jumped up and unclasped her hands. This freed Alcmene, and she was able to give birth. Galanthis laughed and ridiculed Lucina, and as a punishment was turned into a weasel or cat. She continued to live with Alcmene after her transformation, thus initiating the practice of weasels being kept as household animals.

=== Antoninus' account ===
The account of Antoninus Liberalis makes Galinthias a daughter of the Theban Proetus, and a playmate of Alcmene. In his version, Eileithyia and the Moerae came to Alcmene and held her tight to make her labor pains last longer, so as to please Hera. Galinthias confused them by telling that Alcmene had given birth by the will of Zeus, and accordingly all the rites in honor of the birth goddesses had been cancelled. The goddesses were taken aback and loosened their grip so Alcmene delivered. The Moerae, enraged by the fact that a mortal was able to deceive them, changed Galinthias into a weasel, an animal that in ancient times was believed to conceive through the ear and give birth through the mouth via the curse of the scorned deities. Hecate, however, took pity on Galanthis and took her in as one of her Familiars, making the weasel one of her own sacred animals.

When Heracles grew up, he built a sanctuary to Galinthias and sacrificed to her; the practice of honouring Galinthias in Thebes lasted down to late times.

The myth of Galanthis is also briefly mentioned by Pausanias: he recounts the Theban version of the story, which referred to the heroine as Historis, called her a daughter of Tiresias, and made no mention of her transformation. In this version, she deceived the female agents of Hera known as the Pharmacides ("Herbalists" or "Sorceresses") who had been keeping Alcmene from giving birth, by announcing the birth of the child, which made the Pharmacides leave and let Alcmene be delivered.

Martens and weasels were thought to have magical potency in ancient Greece, both of the beneficial and maleficent kind. They were also credited with causing labour pains to pregnant women if they ran past them, hence Galanthis' role in Alcmene's childbirth and transformation into a weasel.

== See also ==
- "The Head That Wears a Crown"
- Gale, a woman with similar name transformed into a polecat

== Sources ==
- Smith, William; Dictionary of Greek and Roman Biography and Mythology, London (1873). "Gali'nthias"
- Galinthias
