= Kurzrock–Miller test =

Infertility test

Kurzrock–Miller in-vitro slide test of sperm–mucus interaction.

The Kurzrock–Miller test is an in-vitro test of sperm–mucus interaction. It consists of establishing an interface between cervical mucus and liquefied semen. It is one of the tests used for investigating infertility.

== Etymology ==
The test is named after Raphael Kurzrock and Thomas Grier Miller.

== Interpretation ==
1. Negative test: Spermatozoa congregate on semen side of the interface, but do not penetrate it.
2. Abnormal: Spermatozoa penetrate the mucus, but rapidly become immobile or acquire shaking movement.
3. Poor: after penetration, spermatozoa do not progress farther than 500 μm.
4. Normal: Spermatozoa penetrate the mucus and >90% are motile with definite progression, crossing 3 cm at 30 minutes.

== See also ==
- Hamster egg penetration test
- Postcoital test
- Sperm–cervical mucus contact test
