= Sperm–cervical mucus contact test =

Infertility test

The sperm–cervical mucus contact test is an in-vitro slide test used for detecting antispermal antibodies. It is one of the investigations done for infertility. It should not be confused with Kurzrock–Miller test, where there is interface between the two materials; whereas in this test the materials are thoroughly mixed.

== Procedure ==
Equal quantities of sperm and mucus are mixed, so there is no interface. If there are antispermal antibodies present, more than 25% sperms show shaky movements. Cross-checking the cervical mucus with another donor semen will confirm whether antibodies are cervical or seminal.

== See also ==
- Hamster egg penetration test
- Postcoital test
