= Cama (animal) =

Conservation status
- Domesticated

Scientific classification
- Kingdom: Animalia
- Phylum: Chordata
- Class: Mammalia
- Infraclass: Placentalia
- Order: Artiodactyla
- Family: Camelidae
- Subfamily: Camelinae
- Hybrid: Camelus dromedarius♂ × Lama glama♀

Hybrid of male dromedary camel and female llama

A cama is a domestic hybrid between a male dromedary camel and a female llama, and has been produced via artificial insemination at the Camel Reproduction Centre in Dubai. The first cama was born on January 14, 1998. The aim was to create an animal capable of higher wool production than the llama, with the size and strength of a camel and a cooperative temperament.

== Breeding ==
The dromedary has 74 diploid chromosomes, the same as other camelids. The autosomes consist of five pairs of small to medium-sized metacentrics and submetacentrics. The X chromosome is the largest in the metacentric and submetacentric group. There are 31 pairs of acrocentrics. The dromedary's karyotype is similar to that of the Bactrian camel.

As an adult, dromedary camels can weigh up to six times as much as a llama; as such, the hybrid needs to be produced by artificial insemination. Insemination of a female llama with sperm from a male dromedary camel has been the only successful combination. Inseminating a female camel with llama sperm has not produced viable offspring.

The first cama named Rama showed signs of becoming sexually mature at age four, when he showed a desire to breed with a female guanaco and a female llama. He was also a behavioral disappointment, displaying an extremely poor temperament. The second cama, a female named Kamilah, was successfully born in 2002. As of April 2008, five camas had been produced.

== Food and drink ==
Much like camels, camas are herbivores that eat shrubs and other plant matter. As they can drink large amounts of water at a time, camas can survive with little or no water for long periods.

== Comparison of camelids ==
The camelid family consists of the Old World camelids (the dromedary camels, Bactrian camels, and wild Bactrian camels) and the New World camelids (the llama, vicuna, suri alpaca, huacaya alpaca, and guanaco). Though there have been successful and fertile hybrids within each major groups of camelids, the cama marks the first instance of cross-breeding between the two groups. The following is a table comparing some of the characteristics of camelids.

Common name	Scientific name	Life span	Adult weight	Height at shoulder	Length of fur	Load-bearing capacity
Dromedary camel	Camelus dromedarius	40–50 years	450–690 kg (990–1,520 lb)	180–240 cm (5.9–7.9 ft)	7.5–10 cm (3.0–3.9 in)	150–230 kg (330–510 lb)
Bactrian camel	Camelus bactrianus	40–50 years	450–1,000 kg (990–2,200 lb)	160–180 cm (5.2–5.9 ft)	25 cm (9.8 in)	150–270 kg (330–600 lb)
Wild Bactrian camel	Camelus ferus	40–50 years	380–820 kg (840–1,810 lb)			
Llama	Lama glama	20–30 years	130–272 kg (287–600 lb)	90–120 cm (3.0–3.9 ft)	8–25 cm (3.1–9.8 in)	30–50 kg (66–110 lb)
Vicuña	Lama vicugna	20–25 years	35–65 kg (77–143 lb)	70–90 cm (2½–3 ft)	1–4 cm (0.39–1.57 in)	10–15 kg (22–33 lb)
Alpaca	Lama pacos	15–20 years	46–90 kg (101–198 lb)	90–120 cm (3.0–3.9 ft)	20–40 cm (7.9–15.7 in)	10–20 kg (22–44 lb)
Guanaco	Lama guanicoe	20–25 years	70–140 kg (150–310 lb)	105–130 cm (3½–4¼ ft)	5 cm (2.0 in)	15–20 kg (33–44 lb)
Cama	Camelus dromedarius × Lama glama	Unknown	81–453 kg (179–999 lb)	125–144 cm (4 1/10-4 3/4 ft)	6 cm (2.4 in)	25–30 kg (55–66 lb)

== See also ==
- Hybrid camel
- Huarizo
