= Huarizo =

Conservation status
- Domesticated

Scientific classification
- Kingdom: Animalia
- Phylum: Chordata
- Class: Mammalia
- Order: Artiodactyla
- Family: Camelidae
- Subfamily: Camelinae
- Tribe: Lamini
- Hybrid: Lama glama♂ × Lama pacos♀

Hybrid of a llama and an alpaca

A huarizo, also known as a llapaca, is a domesticated hybrid cross between a male llama and a female alpaca. The misti is a similar hybrid, a cross between a male alpaca and a female llama. The most common hybrid between South American camelids, huarizo tend to be much smaller than llamas, with longer fibre. Huarizo are fertile and capable of back-crossing with the parent species.

== Other camelidae hybridizations ==
- Camel hybrids
- Cama, a hybrid of camel and llama.
- Llamanaco, a cross between guanaco and llama, has been reported in the wild in the Magallanes Region of Chile.

== See also ==
- Mule and Hinny – two equine cross-species between a horse and a donkey, which can not reproduce.
