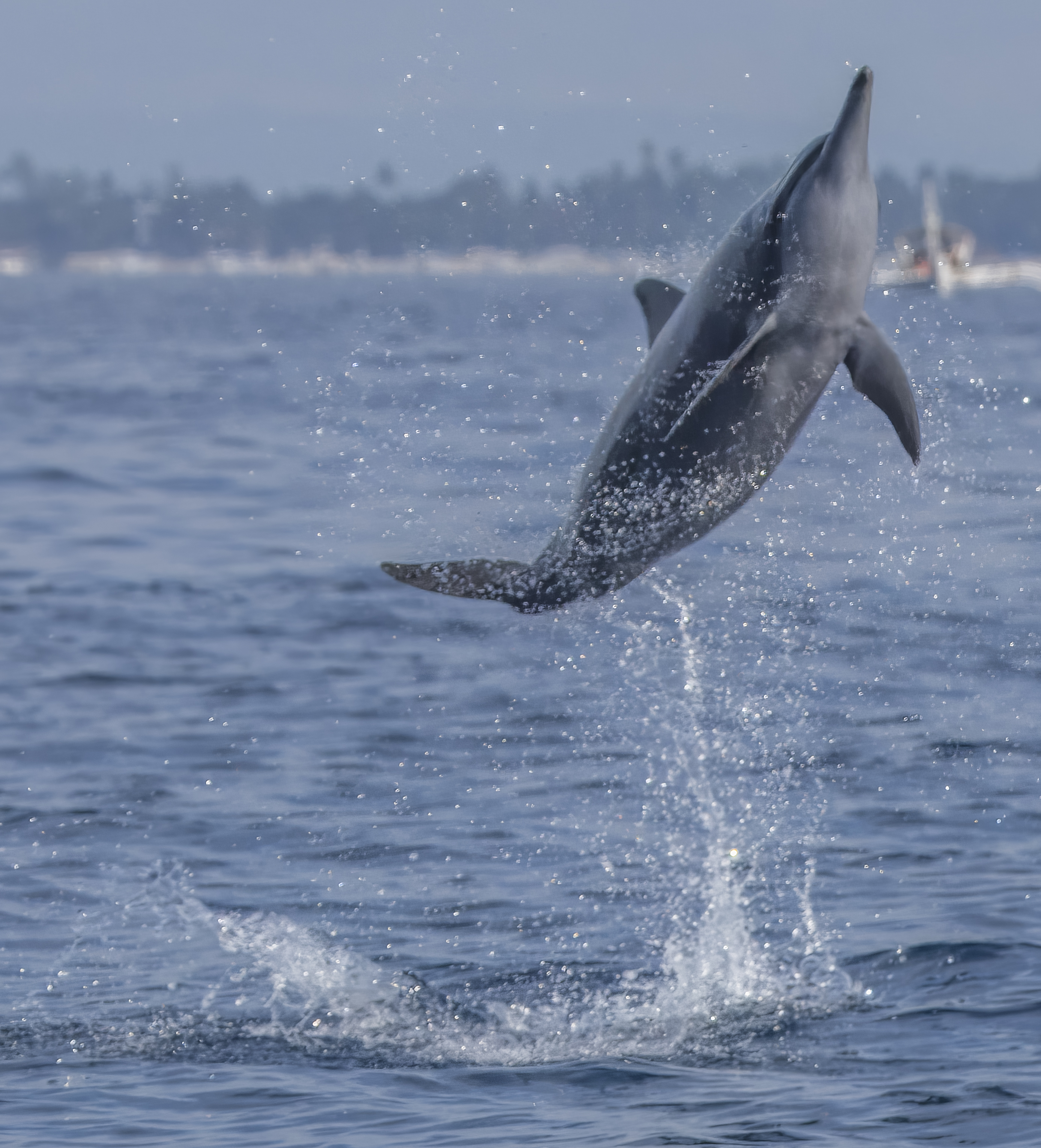
- Gray's spinner dolphin in the Philippnes
- Size compared to an average human

Conservation status
- Least Concern (IUCN 3.1)
- CITES Appendix II

Scientific classification
- Kingdom: Animalia
- Phylum: Chordata
- Class: Mammalia
- Order: Artiodactyla
- Infraorder: Cetacea
- Family: Delphinidae
- Genus: Stenella
- Species: S. longirostris

Binomial name
- Stenella longirostris (Gray, 1828)

Subspecies
- S. l. orientalis; S. l. centroamericana; S. l. longirostris; S. l. roseiventris
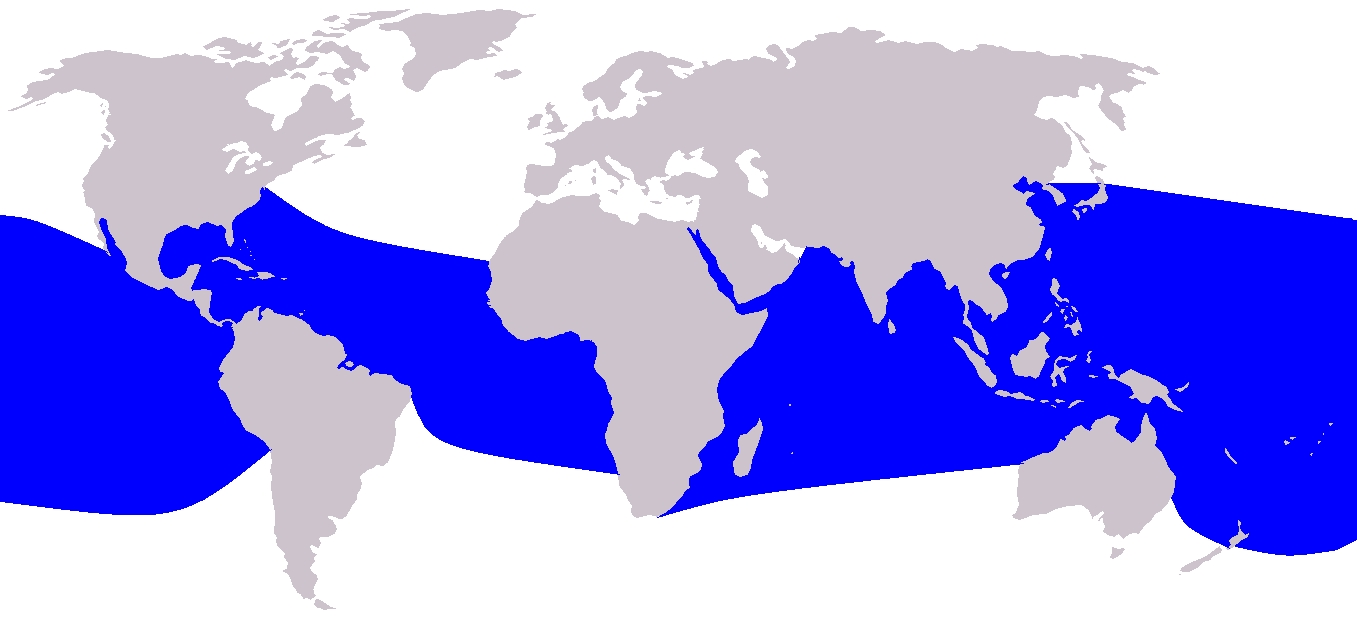
- Spinner Dolphin range

Synonyms
- List: Delphinus longirostris Gray, 1828; Delphinus microps Gray, 1846; Delphinus roseiventris Wagner, 1846; Delphinus alope Gray, 1850; Clymene alope Gray, 1866; Clymene microps Gray. 1866; Steno roseiventris Gray, 1866; Delphinus alope Gray, 1866; Delphinus stenorhynchus Gray, 1866; Clymenia alope Gray, 1868; Clymenia microps Gray, 1868; Clymenia stenorhynchus Gray, 1868; Prodelphinus longirostris Trouessart, 1904

= Spinner dolphin =

Species of mammal

The spinner dolphin (Stenella longirostris) is a small dolphin found in off-shore tropical waters around the world. It is famous for its acrobatic displays in which it rotates around its longitudinal axis as it leaps through the air. It is a member of the family Delphinidae of toothed whales.

The distribution of the spinner dolphin extends across the tropical and subtropical waters of all oceans. Spinner dolphins exhibit a diurnal schedule characterised by predictable daily geographic migrations, spending mornings resting and socialising in shallow coastal waters before travelling offshore to forage at night.

Concerns have been raised regarding the effects of anthropogenic activities on the species. Tourist vessels used for dolphin watching may disrupt normal behaviour, particularly when vessel numbers are high or when vessels approach dolphins more closely than permitted by local guidelines.

== Taxonomy ==
The spinner dolphin is sometimes referred to as the long-snouted dolphin, particularly in older texts, to distinguish it from the similar Clymene dolphin, which is often called the short-snouted spinner dolphin. The species was described by John Gray in 1828. The four named subspecies are:

- Eastern spinner dolphin (S. l. orientalis), from the tropical eastern Pacific.
- Central American or Costa Rican spinner dolphin (S. l. centroamericana), also found in the tropical eastern Pacific.
- Gray's or Hawaiian spinner dolphin (S. l. longirostris), from the central Pacific Ocean around Hawaii but represents a mixture of broadly similar subtypes found worldwide.
- Dwarf spinner dolphin (S. l. roseiventris), first found in the Gulf of Thailand.

There could however, be more subspecies currently undescribed, and more research is needed in this topic. A hybrid form between the Gray's Spinner and Eastern Spinner called the White-Bellied Spinner lives in the eastern Pacific, characterized by its white belly.

The species name comes from the Latin word for long-beaked.

== Description ==
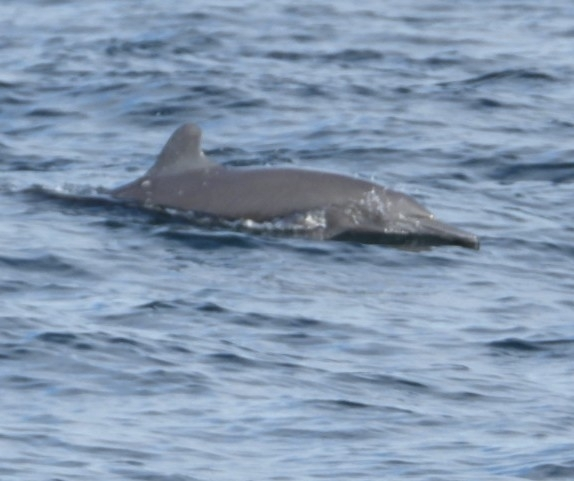
In some populations, the dorsal fin curves forwards, a trait most prominent in males

Spinner dolphins are small cetaceans with a slim build. Adults are typically 129–235 cm long and reach a body mass of 23–79 kg. This species has an elongated rostrum and a triangular or subtriangular dorsal fin. Spinner dolphins generally have tripartite color patterns. The dorsal area is dark gray, the sides light gray, and the underside pale gray or white. Also, a dark band runs from the eye to the flipper, bordered above by a thin, light line. However, the spinner dolphin has more geographic variation in form and coloration than other cetaceans. In the open waters of eastern Pacific, dolphins have relatively small skulls with short rostra. A dwarf form of spinner dolphin occurs around Southeast Asia. In these same subspecies, a dark dorsal cape dims their tripartite color patterns. Further offshore, subspecies tend to have a paler and less far-reaching cape. In certain subspecies, some males may have upright fins that slant forward. Some populations of spinner dolphin found in the eastern Pacific have backwards-facing dorsal fins, and males can have dorsal humps and upturned caudal flukes.

== Ecology ==
The spinner dolphin lives in nearly all tropical and subtropical waters between 40°N and 40°S. The species primarily inhabits coastal waters, islands, or banks. However, in the eastern tropical Pacific, spinner dolphins live far from shore. Spinner dolphins may use different habitats depending on the season.

The spinner dolphin feeds mainly on small mesopelagic fish, squids, and sergestid shrimps, and will dive 200–300 m to feed on them. Spinner dolphins of Hawaii are nocturnal feeders and forage in deep scattering layers, which contain many species. The dwarf spinner dolphin may feed mostly on benthic fish in reefs and shallow water. Off Oahu, Hawaii, spinner dolphins forage at night and cooperatively herd their prey into highly dense patches. They swim around the prey in a circle and a pair may swim through the circle to make a catch.

Spinner dolphins are preyed on by sharks. Other possible predators include the killer whale, the false killer whale, the pygmy killer whale and the short-finned pilot whale. They are susceptible to parasites, and are known to exhibit both external ones like barnacles and remoras, and internal ones, like nematodes, trematodes, cestodes and acanthocephalans.

== Behavior and life history ==
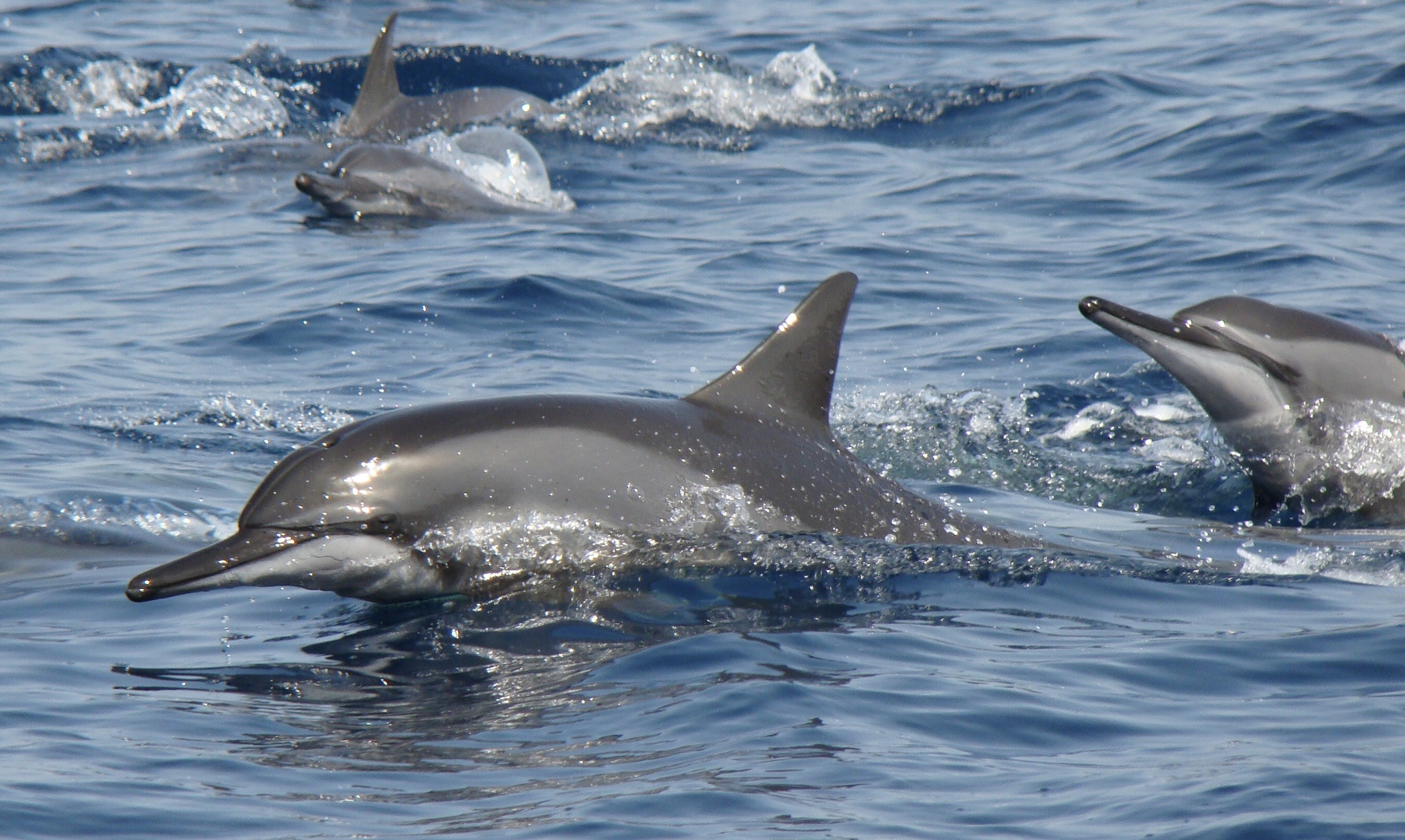
In the Gulf of Oman

Due to the spinner dolphin foraging and feeding at night, in certain regions, such as Hawaii and northern Brazil, dolphins spend the daytime resting in shallow bays near deep water. Spinner dolphins rest as a single unit, moving back and forth slowly in a tight formation but just out of contact with one another. These resting behaviors are observed for about four to five hours daily. During rest periods, spinner dolphins rely on vision rather than echolocation. At dusk, they travel offshore to feed. They travel along the shore during foraging trips, and the individuals that occupy the same bay may change daily. Some individual dolphins do not always go to a bay to rest; however, in Hawaii, dolphins do seem to return to the same site each trip.

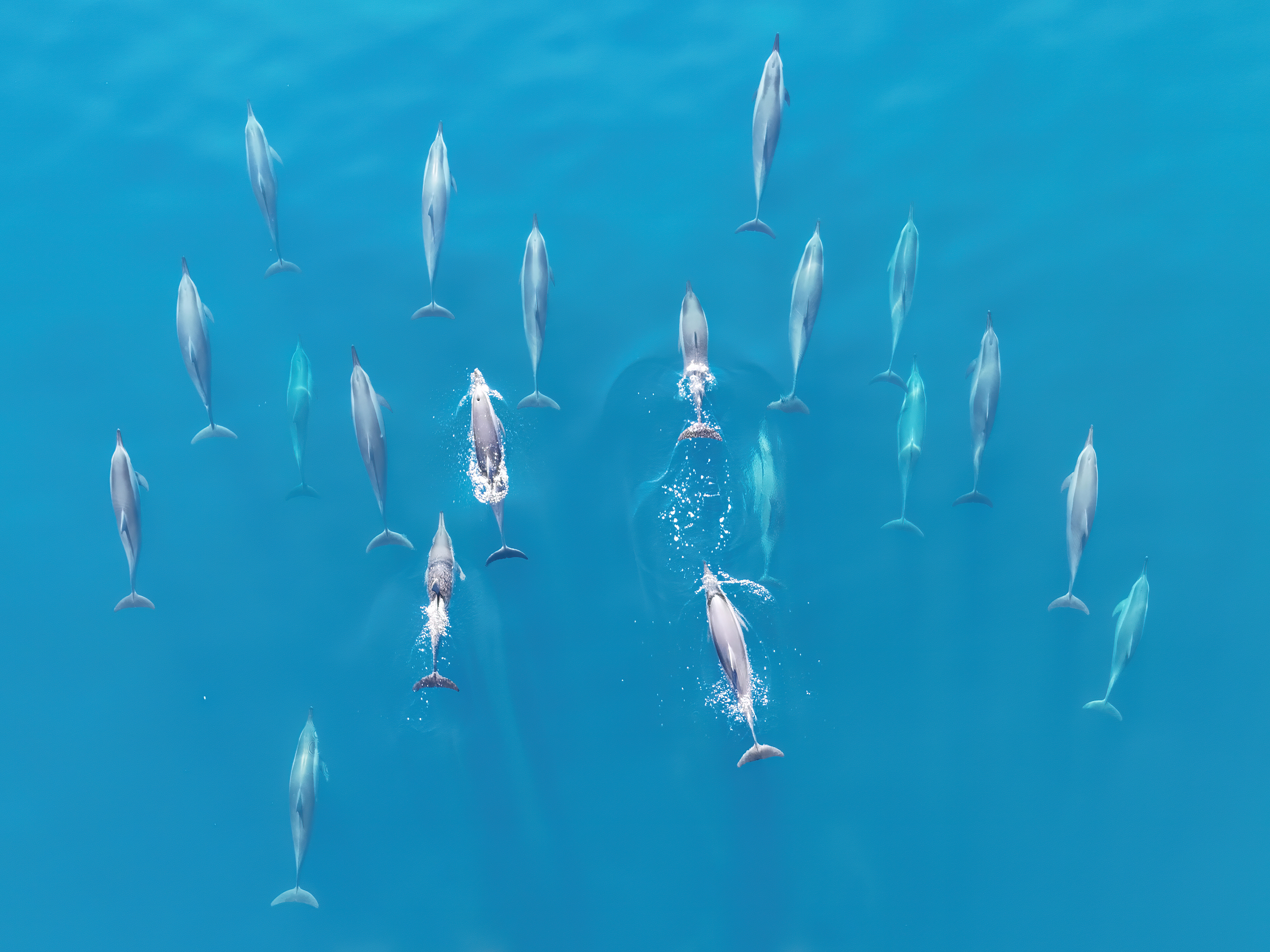
A pod in the Indian ocean

Spinner dolphins live in an open and loose social organization. The spinner dolphins of Hawaii live in family groups, but also have associations with others beyond their groups. Mothers and calves form strong social bonds. Spinner dolphins seem to have a promiscuous mating system, with individuals changing partners for up to some weeks. A dozen adult males may gather into coalitions. Vocalizations of spinner dolphins include whistles, which may be used to organize the school, burst-pulse signals, and echolocation clicks. The spinner dolphin has a 10-month gestation period, and mothers nurse their young for one to two years. Females are sexually mature at four to seven years, with three-year calving intervals, while males are sexually mature at seven to 10 years. Spinner dolphins live for about 20-25 years. Breeding is seasonal, more so in certain regions than others.

Although most spinner dolphins are found in the deeper waters offshore of the islands, the rest of the Hawaiʻi population has a more coastal distribution. During daytime hours, the island-associated stocks of Hawaiian spinner dolphins seek sanctuary in nearshore waters, where they return to certain areas to socialize, rest, and nurture their young.

=== Spinning behavior ===
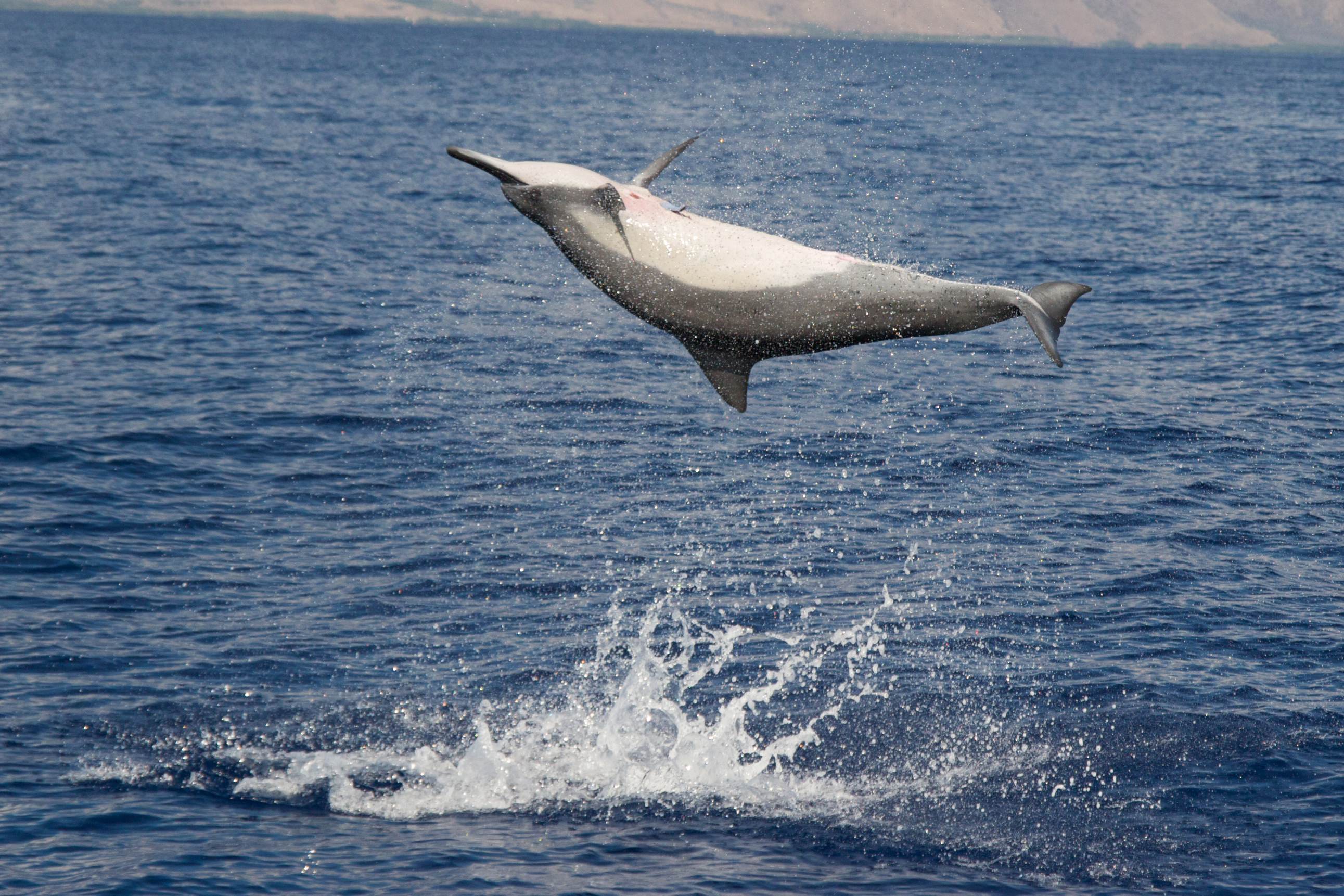
In Hawaii

Spinner dolphins are known for their acrobatics and aerial behaviors. A spinner dolphin comes out of the water front first and twists its body as it rises into the air. When it reaches its maximum height, the dolphin descends back into the water, landing on its side. A dolphin can make two to seven spins in one leap; the swimming and rotational speed of the dolphin as it spins underwater affects the number of spins it can do while airborne. These spins may serve several functions. Some of these functions are believed by experts to be acoustic signaling or communication. Another reason is to remove ectoparasites such as remoras. Dolphins may also make nose-outs, tail slaps, flips, head slaps, "salmon leaps", and side and back slaps.

== Conservation status ==
The protected status of spinner dolphins are CITES Appendix II and Marine Mammal Protection Act (MMPA) protected throughout its range as well as MMPA depleted in its eastern stock. Tens of thousands of spinner dolphins, mostly eastern and white-bellied varieties, were killed in the 30 years after purse seine fishing for tuna began in the 1950s. The process killed probably half of all eastern spinner dolphins. They have also been contaminated by pollutants such as DDT and PCBs. Spinner dolphins, as with other species affected by ETP tuna purse-seine fishing, are managed nationally by the coastal countries and internationally by the IATTC. The IATTC has imposed annual stock mortality limits on each purse seine and promulgated regulations regarding the safe release of dolphins.

The eastern tropical Pacific and Southeast Asian populations of the spinner dolphin are listed on Appendix II of the Convention on the Conservation of Migratory Species of Wild Animals (CMS), since they have an unfavourable conservation status or would benefit significantly from international co-operation organized by tailored agreements.

In addition, the spinner dolphin is covered by Memorandum of Understanding for the Conservation of Cetaceans and Their Habitats in the Pacific Islands Region (Pacific Cetaceans MoU) and the Memorandum of Understanding Concerning the Conservation of the Manatee and Small Cetaceans of Western Africa and Macaronesia (Western African Aquatic Mammals MoU). Spinner dolphins are susceptible to disease and two of the recorded diseases within them are toxoplasmosis and cetacean morbillivirus. The number of cases reported however is fairly low in the species.

Spinner dolphins in Hawaii receive multiple daily visits to their near-shore resting grounds, with boats taking people out daily to snorkel and interact with the local dolphin population. Such activities are increasingly coming under criticism on the grounds of possible harm to the dolphins, and efforts are being made both to educate the public in order to minimise human impact on the dolphins, and to bring in regulations to govern these activities.

In 2023, 33 swimmers were arrested for reportedly harassing dolphins off the coast of the Big Island of Hawaii. The swimmers reportedly broke federal law by swimming within 45 meters (50 yards) of the dolphins. The ban went into effect in 2021 due to dolphins not getting enough rest during the day to forage for food at night. The swimmers were caught by drone footage pursuing the dolphins as they tried to escape.

== Gallery ==
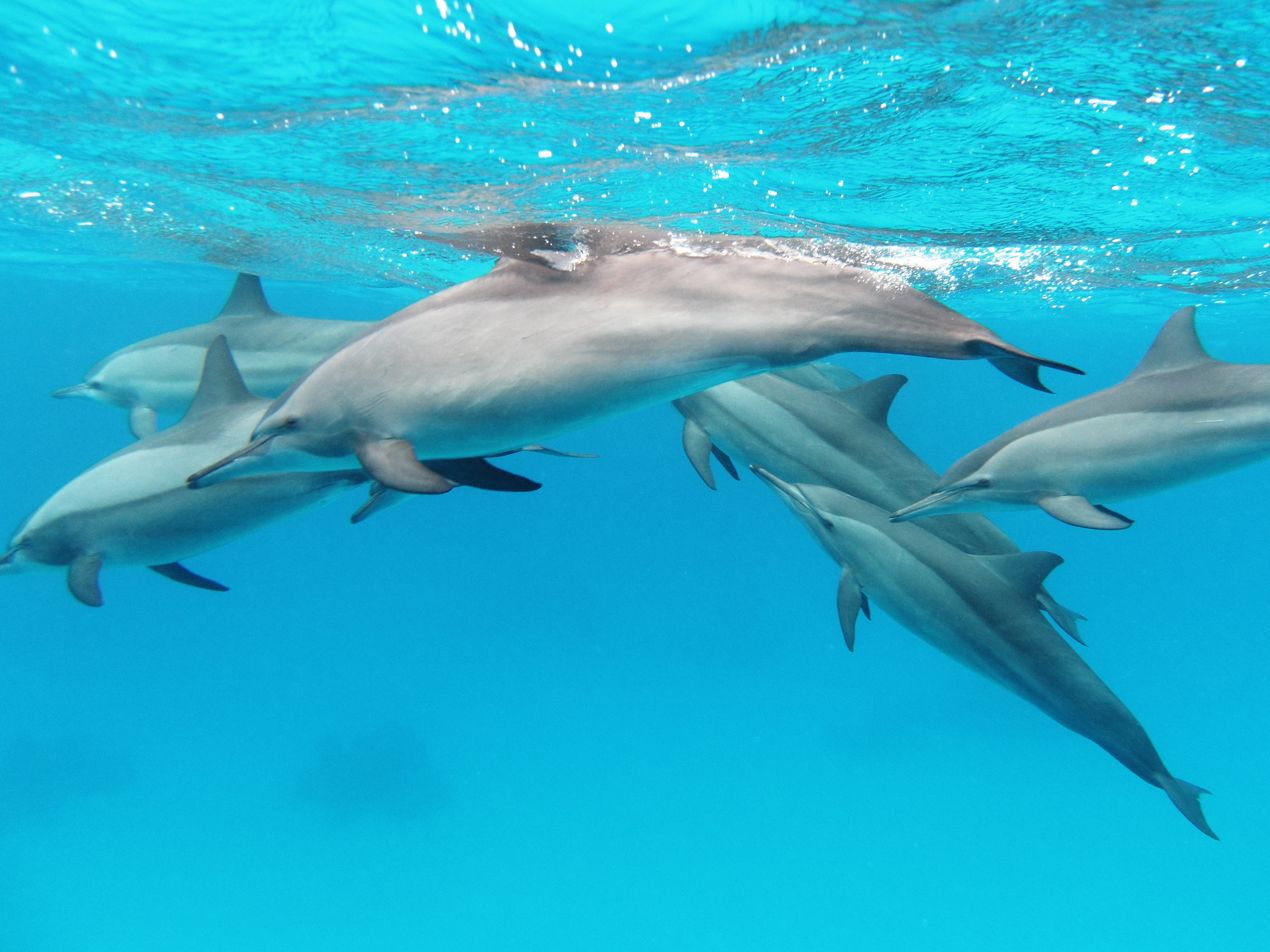
A pod of spinner dolphins in the Red Sea

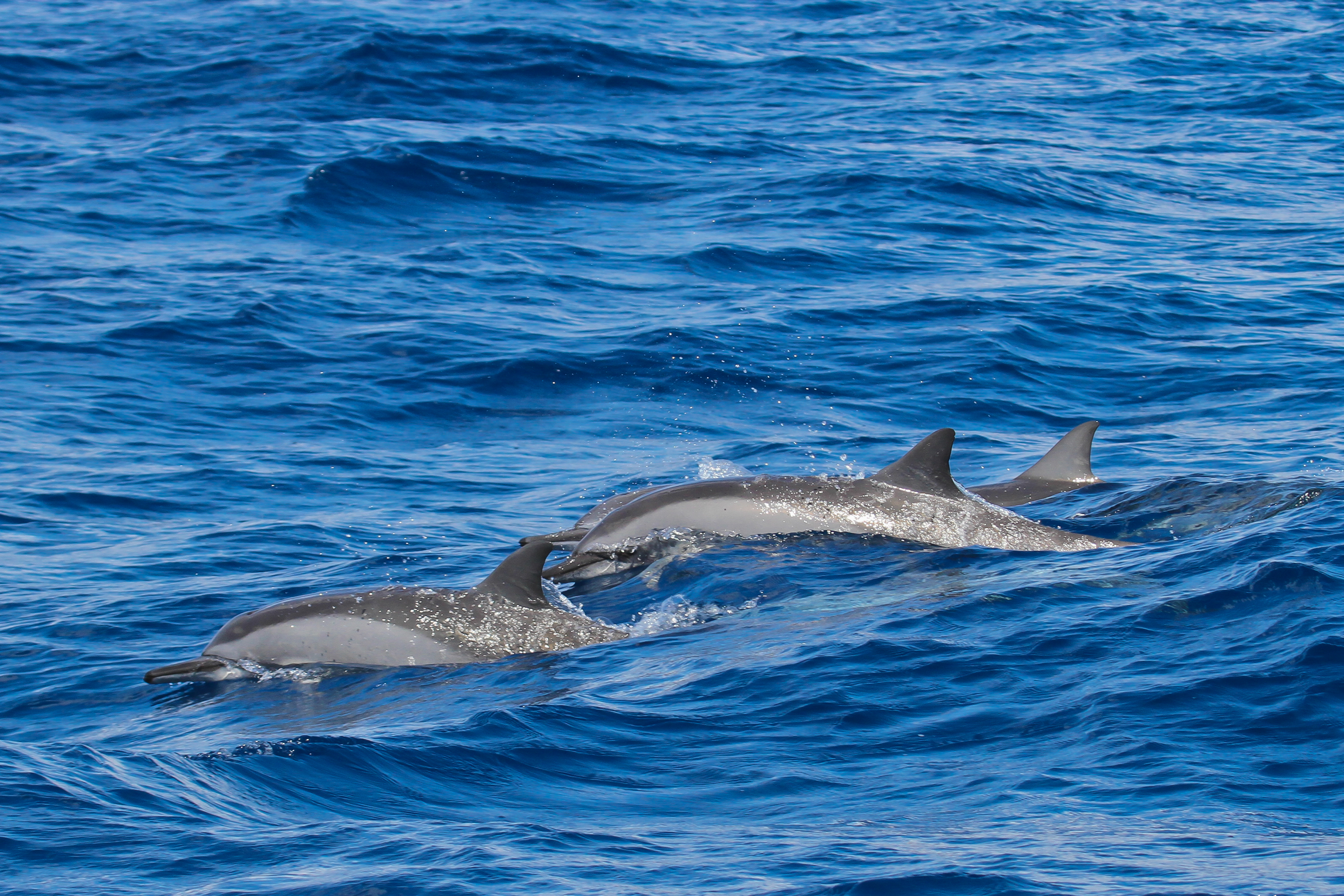
At Alphonse Atoll

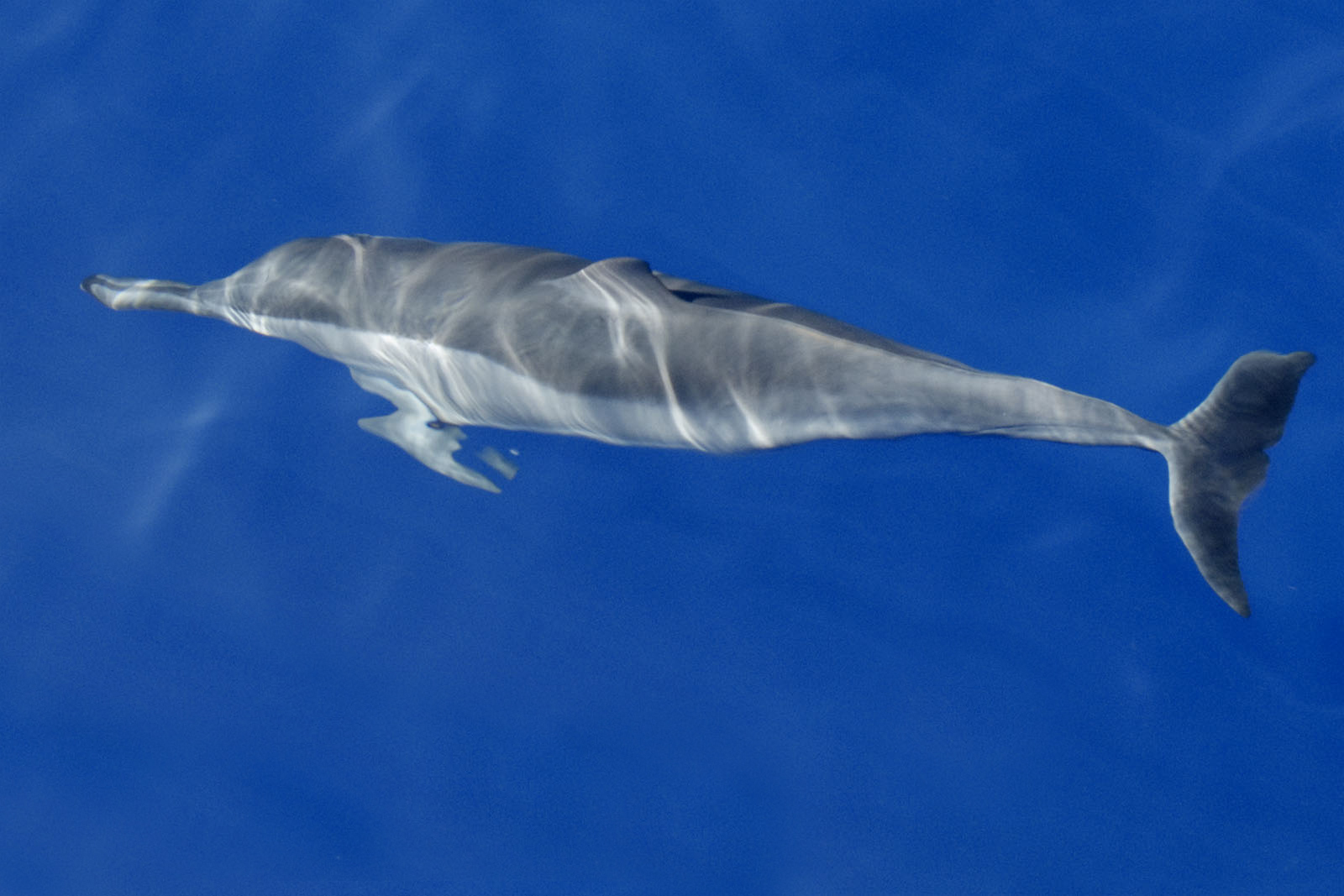
At Lanai, Hawaii

Hawaiian spinner dolphin spinning

Video of spinner dolphins, at Midway Atoll

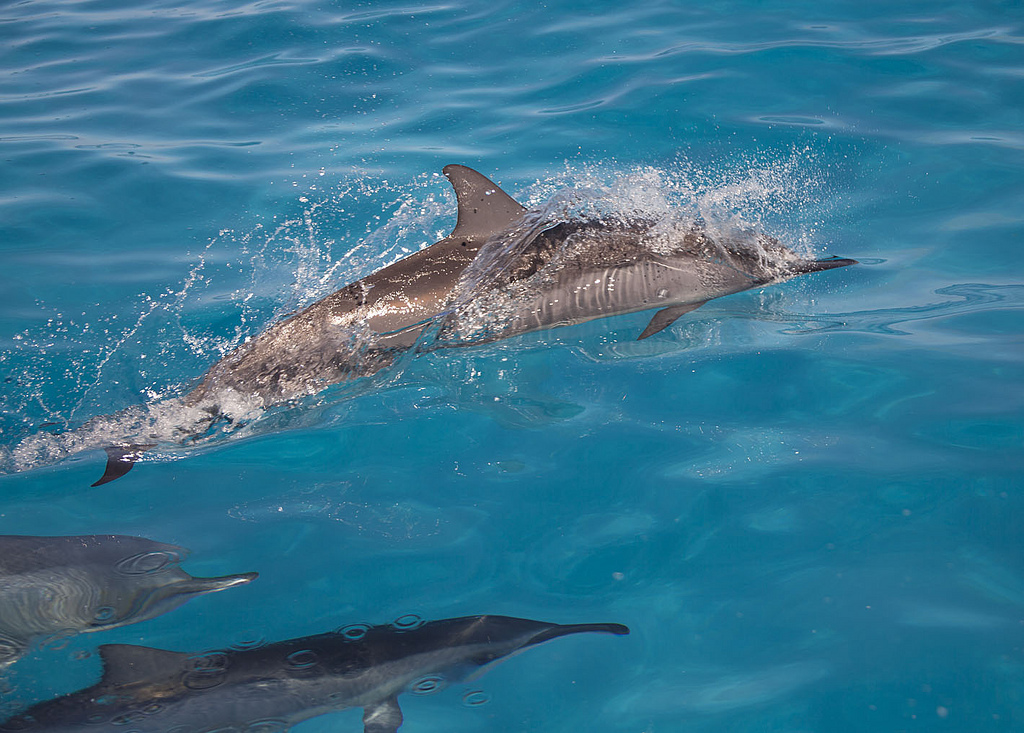
Porpoising in Papahānaumokuākea Marine National Monument

== See also ==
- List of cetaceans
- Marine biology
