= Hybrid cell line =

A hybrid cell line is a fusion of cells from two different cell types. When the membrane of two cells merge, the nuclei combine to form a polykaryote (poly- multiple; karyon- chromosome). These fusions can happen spontaneously as in the case of tumor hybrid cells, or may be induced by a variety of laboratory techniques.

The first instance of intentionally generated hybrid cells was described in 1960 by Barski, Sorieul, and Cornefert in their paper "Production of cells of a 'hybrid' nature in cultures in vitro of 2 cellular strains in combination," originally published in French. Today, one purpose of generating hybrid cell lines is to fuse cells that secrete a useful product with an immortal cell line to maximize the secretions. For example, immunoglobin-producing B lymphocytes can be fused with myeloma to produce an immortal line of cells called hybridoma that secrete immunoglobin. Hybrid cell lines are also used to study cancer and map genes

== Generating hybrid cells ==
The three most common methods of fusing cells to make a hybrid line are via oncogenic viruses, polyethylene glycol, or electrofusion.

=== Oncogenic viruses ===
Certain oncogenic viruses encode for fusogens, which are proteins that encourage two cell membranes to fuse. When the viral genes are expressed by the host cell, the membranes of two cells may fuse.

Some oncogenic viruses that code for fusogens and are capable of hybridizing cells are:

- Epstein-Barr virus
- HPV
- Hepatitis B and Hepatitis C
- Human T-cell lymphotropic virus type 1 (HTLV-1)

The virus used in laboratories for controlled cell hybridization is inactivated Sendai virus.

=== Polyethylene glycol ===
Using polyethylene glycol is the method for inducing cell hybridization that requires the fewest steps. Polyethylene glycol functions by changing the direction and configuration of lipid molecules in the cell membrane, which increases their permeability and allows two membranes to fuse. Because of the low specificity of polyethylene glycol, it may be toxic to the cell.

=== Electrofusion ===
When exposed to an alternating electric field, cells in suspension will line up like a chain along the electrical field lines. This is due to a phenomenon known as dielectrophoresis. After the cells are aligned, a pulse voltage around 10V can be applied, causing the membranes of these cells to fuse. The cells will homogenate into a single cell.

== Examples of hybrid cell lines ==
- Hybridoma: a fusion of B-cells and immortal cancer cells with the purpose of generating antibodies.
- Tumor hybrid cells: fusion of tumor cells with normal bodily cells. These tend to take on new properties which make them more difficult to treat.
- Human-mouse hybrid cells, i.e. HeLa/mouse hybrid. These can be used as a diagnostic tool for conditions such as aneuploidy, but this is a dated technique that is rarely applied anymore.
- Humsters: a hybrid of human sperm and hamster eggs. These are created as a byproduct of fertility testing, when human sperm potency is measured by how well it can penetrate a hamster egg cell (hamster eggs tend to have similar penetrability to human sperm as do human eggs). For more information, see semen analysis.
