= Humster =

Single-celled hybrid of human and hamster

A humster is a hybrid cell line made from a zona-free hamster oocyte fertilized with human sperm. It always consists of single cells and cannot form a multi-cellular being. Humsters are usually destroyed before they divide into two cells; if isolated and left alone to divide, they would still be unviable.

Humsters are routinely created mainly for two reasons:

- To avoid legal issues with working with pure human embryonic stem cell lines.
- To assess the viability of human sperm for in vitro fertilization

Somatic cell hybrids between humans and hamsters or mice have been used for the mapping of various traits since at least the 1970s.

== See also ==
- Hamster zona-free ovum test
- Human–animal hybrid
- Recombinant DNA
- Cell line
