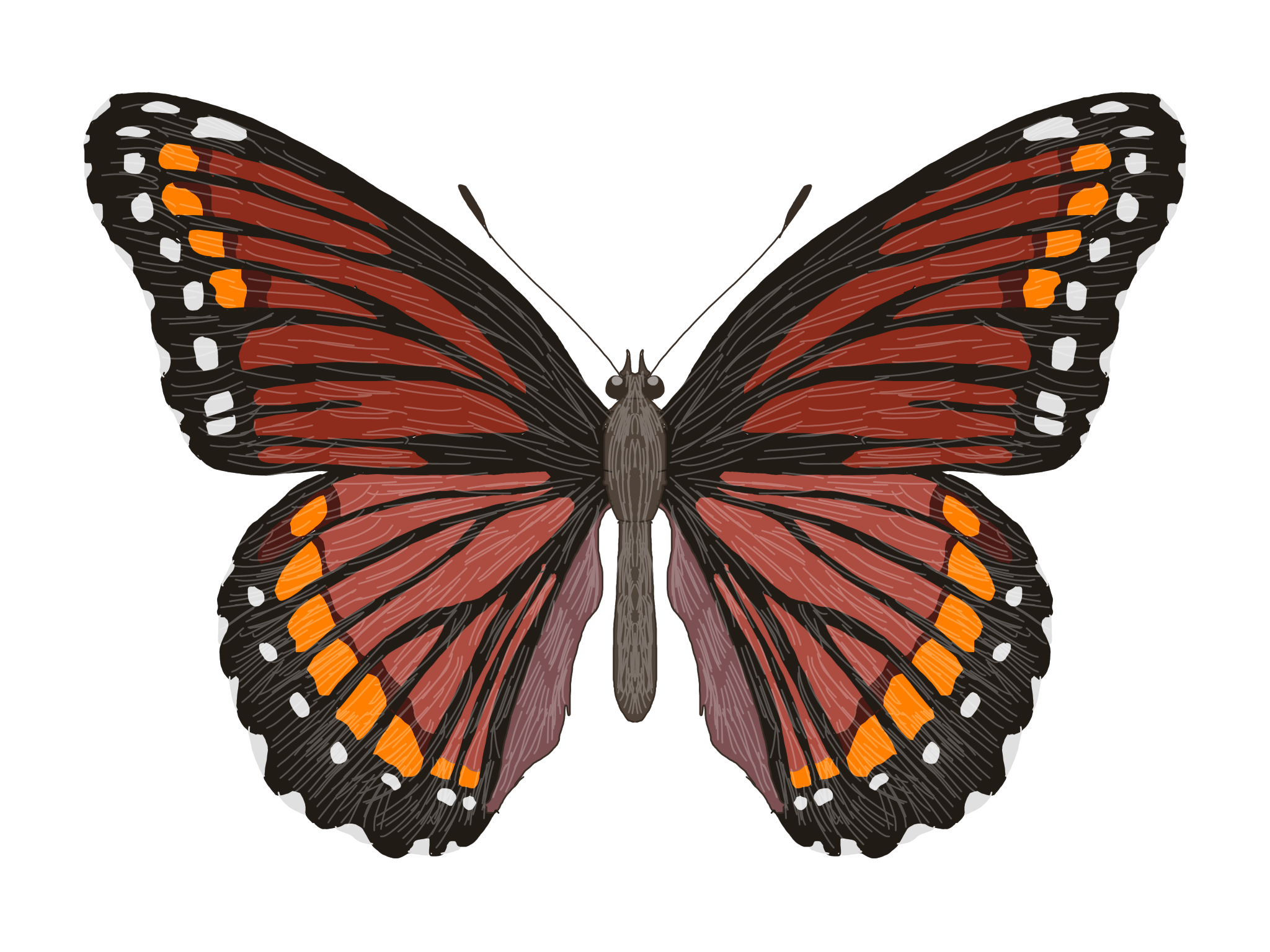

Scientific classification
- Domain: Eukaryota
- Kingdom: Animalia
- Phylum: Arthropoda
- Class: Insecta
- Order: Lepidoptera
- Family: Nymphalidae
- Tribe: Limenitidini
- Genus: Limenitis
- Species: L. archippus × L. arthemis

= Rubidus =

Genus of butterflies

The rubidus is a hybrid species of butterfly found in the eastern regions of North America. The rubidus is the offspring of a Viceroy and a white admiral or a red spotted purple, with hybridisation being more common in the latter as the viceroy and red spotted butterfly inhabit more common land.

This hybrid can be manufactured in laboratory conditions by facilitating the interbreeding of the two butterfly species, but it can be also found in nature as their range overlaps which can lead to them breeding. It is not known whether the rubidus is fertile or sterile. If it is a fertile hybrid, it can breed with other hybrids and essentially create a new species similarly to the Appalachian tiger swallowtail which initially started as a hybrid between the Eastern tiger swallowtail and the Canadian tiger swallowtail
