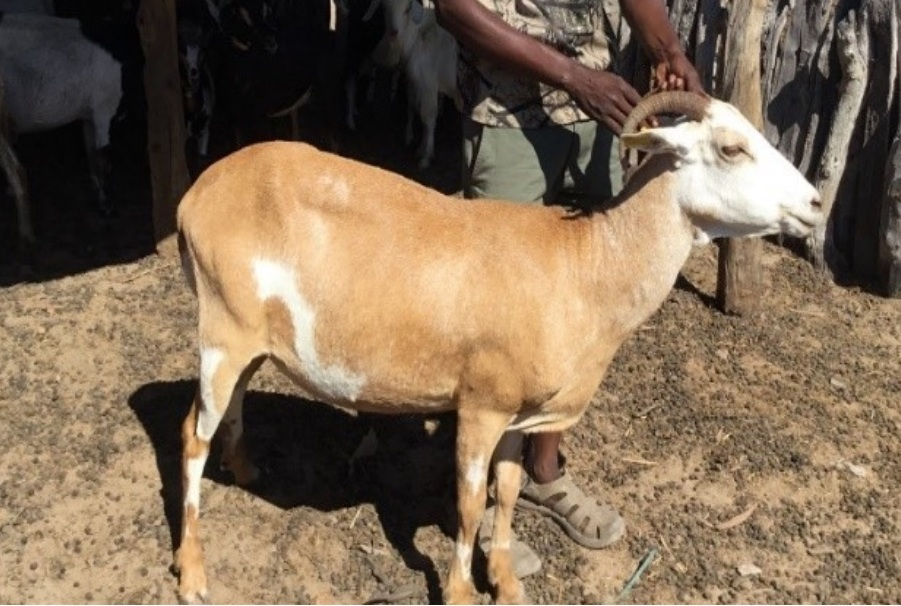
- A 4-year-old female hybrid born under natural conditions in Onamatanga, Namibia

Conservation status
- Domesticated

Scientific classification
- Kingdom: Animalia
- Phylum: Chordata
- Class: Mammalia
- Order: Artiodactyla
- Family: Bovidae
- Subfamily: Caprinae
- Tribe: Caprini
- Hybrid: Ovis aries × Capra aegagrus hircus

= Sheep–goat hybrid =

Hybrid between a sheep and a goat

A sheep–goat hybrid (called a geep in popular media or sometimes a shoat (Note: Not to be confused with a young pig, the more common meaning of the word shoat.)) is a domestic bovid hybrid between a sheep and a goat.

While sheep and goats are similar and can be mated, they belong to different genera in the subfamily Caprinae of the family Bovidae. Sheep belong to the genus Ovis and have 54 chromosomes, while goats belong to the genus Capra and have 60 chromosomes. The offspring of a sheep–goat pairing is generally stillborn. Despite widespread shared pasturing of goats and sheep, hybrids are very rare, demonstrating the genetic distance between the two species. They are not to be confused with sheep–goat chimera, which are artificially created by combining the embryos of a goat and a sheep.

== Characteristics ==
There is a long-standing belief in sheep–goat hybrids, which is presumably due to the animals' resemblance to each other. Some primitive varieties of sheep may be misidentified as goats. In Darwinism – An Exposition of the Theory of Natural Selection with Some of Its Applications (1889), Alfred Russel Wallace wrote:

[...] the following statement of Mr. Low: "It has been long known to shepherds, though questioned by naturalists, that the progeny of the cross between the sheep and goat is fertile. Breeds of this mixed race are numerous in the north of Europe." Nothing appears to be known of such hybrids either in Scandinavia or in Italy; but Professor Giglioli of Florence has kindly given me some useful references to works in which they are described. The following extract from his letter is very interesting: "I need not tell you that there being such hybrids is now generally accepted as a fact. Buffon (Supplements, tom. iii. p. 7, 1756) obtained one such hybrid in 1751 and eight in 1752. Sanson (La Culture, vol. vi. p. 372, 1865) mentions a case observed in the Vosges, France. Geoff. St. Hilaire (Hist. Nat. Gén. des reg. org., vol. iii. p. 163) was the first to mention, I believe, that in different parts of South America the ram is more usually crossed with the she-goat than the sheep with the he-goat. The well-known 'pellones' of Chile are produced by the second and third generation of such hybrids (Gay, 'Hist, de Chile,' vol. i. p. 466, Agriculture, 1862). Hybrids bred from goat and sheep are called 'chabin' in French, and 'cabruno' in Spanish. In Chile such hybrids are called 'carneros lanudos'; their breeding inter se appears to be not always successful, and often the original cross has to be recommenced to obtain the proportion of three-eighths of he-goat and five-eighths of sheep, or of three-eighths of ram and five-eighths of she-goat; such being the reputed best hybrids."

Supposedly, most sheep–goat hybrids die as embryos. Hybrid male mammals are often sterile, demonstrating a phenomenon known as Haldane's rule. The Haldane phenomenon may apply even when the parent species have the same number of chromosomes, as in most cat-species hybrids. It sometimes does not apply when the species chromosome number is different, as in wild horse (chromosome number = 66) with domestic horse (chromosome number = 64) hybrids. Hybrid female fertility tends to decrease with increasing divergence in chromosome similarity between parent species. Presumably, this is due to mismatch problems during meiosis and the resulting production of eggs with unbalanced genetic complements. However, a buck–ewe hybrid born in 2014 died of pregnancy related complications in 2018 raising the question if the parent–species combination has an influence on hybrid fertility.

Blood transcriptome analysis of a buck–ewe hybrid and its parents revealed significant deviations from previously described imprinting schemes and a higher contribution from the goat genome to the genes expressed in the hybrid's blood. Due to the common genome, buck–ewe hybrid share 870 common genes with the paternal goat and 368 genes with the maternal sheep.

== Alleged and confirmed cases ==
At the Botswana Ministry of Agriculture in 2000, a male sheep impregnated a female goat resulting in a live male offspring. This hybrid had 57 chromosomes, intermediate between sheep (54) and goats (60) and was intermediate between the two parent species in type. It had a coarse outer coat, a woolly inner coat, long goat-like legs and a heavy sheep-like body. Although infertile, the hybrid had a very active libido, mounting both ewes and does even when they were not in heat. He was castrated when he was 10 months old, as were the other kids and lambs in the herd.

A male sheep impregnated a female goat in New Zealand resulting in a mixed litter of kids and a female sheep–goat hybrid with 57 chromosomes. The hybrid was subsequently shown to be fertile when mated with a ram.

In France, natural mating of a doe with a ram produced a female hybrid carrying 57 chromosomes. This animal, backcrossed to a ram in the veterinary college of Nantes, delivered a stillborn and a living male offspring with 54 chromosomes.

In March 2014, a buck–ewe hybrid was born on a farm close to Göttingen in Germany. Also in March 2014, a male buck–ewe hybrid was born in Ireland.

There was a reported case of live births of twin geep on a farm in Ireland in 2018.

There was a reported case of a live birth of a sheep–goat hybrid on a farm in Tábor in Czech Republic in 2020. Her name was Barunka and she had health complications after being born. Her owners did not know if she was a goat or sheep, since neither goats nor sheep accepted her. Upon further inspection, it was discovered she was a sheep–goat hybrid.

In May 2021, a healthy doe–ram hybrid was born on a farm in the US state of Kentucky, despite complications during labor. Her status as a hybrid was confirmed by genetic testing: she has a hybrid karyotype of 57, XX.

== Sheep–goat chimera ==
A sheep–goat chimera is a chimera produced by combining the embryos of a goat and a sheep. The first sheep–goat chimeras were created in 1984 by researchers at the Institute of Animal Physiology in Cambridge, England. The successful chimeras were a mosaic of goat and sheep cells and tissues.

In a chimera, each set of cells (germ line) keeps its own species' identity instead of being intermediate in type between the parental species. Because the chimera contains cells from (at least) two genetically different embryos, and each of these arose by fertilization of an egg by a sperm cell, it has (at least) four genetic parents. In contrast, a hybrid has only two. Although the individual cells in interspecies chimeras are entirely of one of the component species, their behaviour is influenced by the environment in which they find themselves. The sheep–goat chimeras have yielded several demonstrations of this. The most obvious was that the woolly areas of their fleece, tufts of goat wool (angora-type) grew intermingled with ordinary sheep wool, even though the goat breed used in the experiments did not exhibit any wool whatsoever.

Sheep–goat chimeras as a general rule may be assumed to be fertile, with the reservations that apply to chimeras generally (which again reflect that the parent embryos may have been of different sex, so that the animal, apart from being a chimera, may also be intersex). But in accordance with the mosaic- (as opposed to hybrid-) nature of the interspecies chimera, any individual sperm or egg cell it produces must be of either the pure sheep or the pure goat variety. Whether in fact viable germ cells of both species may be, or have been, produced within the same individual is unknown.
