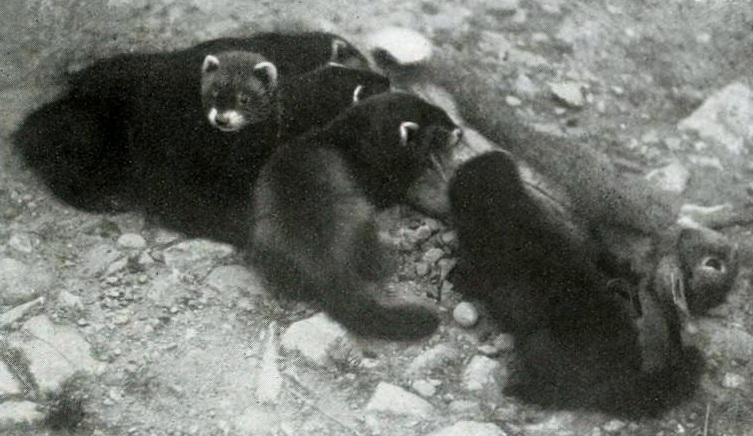
- First-generation, eight-week-old polecat–ferret hybrids

Scientific classification
- Kingdom: Animalia
- Phylum: Chordata
- Class: Mammalia
- Order: Carnivora
- Family: Mustelidae
- Subfamily: Mustelinae
- Genus: Mustela
- Subgenus: Putorius
- Species: M. putorius × M. furo

= Polecat–ferret hybrid =

Hybrid domesticated mammal

A polecat–ferret hybrid (Mustela putorius × M. furo) is a hybrid between a wild European polecat (Mustela putorius) and a domesticated ferret (Mustela furo). Offspring of such a cross between the two animals typically have a distinct white throat patch, white feet and white hairs interspersed among the fur. It is currently impossible to distinguish pure polecats from hybrids through DNA analysis, as the two forms are too closely related and inter-mixed to be separated through current (2010) genetic methods.

The advantages of polecat–ferret hybrids over purebred domestic ferrets include the hybrids' better eyesight, their greater physical capabilities, and their more independent nature. The disadvantages are that hybrids are less willing to be handled, require rigorous enrichment routines in order to prevent boredom, may refuse to enter unfamiliar burrows, and do not cope well with being caged. First-generation crossbreeds usually develop their wild parent's fear of humans if left with their mother during the critical socialisation period between 7 1/2 and 8 1/2 weeks of age.

In some parts of Britain, the escape of domesticated ferrets has led to ferret–polecat hybridisation in the wild. Ferrets were likely first brought to Britain after the Norman conquest of England (in the 11th century) or as late as the 14th century. John George Wood wrote in 1870 that polecat–ferrets were sometimes used by hunters alongside pure ferrets. In modern times, alleged ferret–polecat hybrids are occasionally advertised as superior to pure ferrets for the purposes of rabbiting, though actual hybrids are very likely to be less handleable, less willing to familiarise themselves with dogs, and more likely to kill their quarry outright rather than simply flush it from its burrow.

== See also ==
- Polecat–mink hybrid
