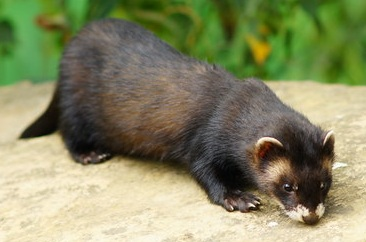
- European polecat (M. putorius)
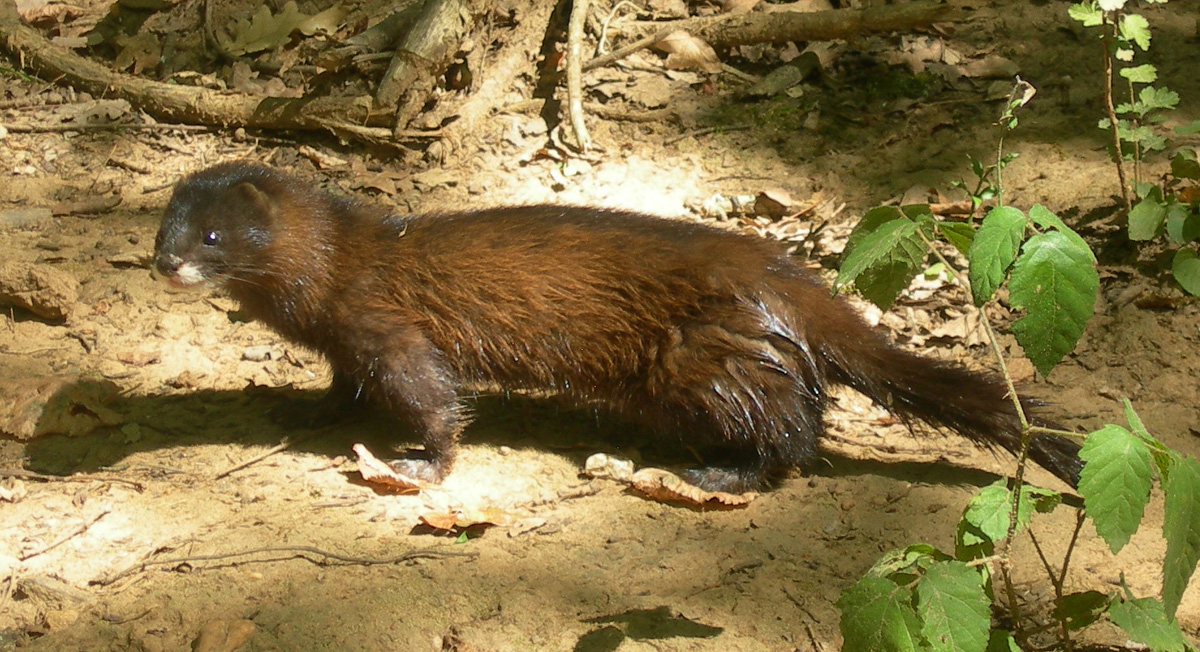
- European mink (M. lutreola)

Scientific classification
- Kingdom: Animalia
- Phylum: Chordata
- Class: Mammalia
- Order: Carnivora
- Family: Mustelidae
- Subfamily: Mustelinae
- Genus: Mustela
- Species: M. putorius × M. lutreola

= Polecat–mink hybrid =

Hybrid species of mammal

A polecat–mink hybrid, also known as khor'-tumak by furriers and khonorik by fanciers, is a hybrid between a European polecat (Mustela putorius) and a European mink (M. lutreola). Such hybridisation is very rare in the wild, and typically only occurs where European mink are declining. The two species likely began hybridising during the early 20th century, when Northern Europe underwent a warm climatic period which coincided with an expansion of the range of the polecat into the mink's habitat.

== Description ==
Polecat–mink hybrids have a poorly defined facial mask, have yellow fur on the ears, grey-yellow underfur and long, dark-brown guard hairs. They are fairly large, with males attaining the peak sizes known for European polecats (weighing 1.12–1.75 kg (2.5–3.9 lb) and measuring 41–47 cm (16–19 in) in length) and females being much larger than female European minks (weighing around 0.75 kg (1.7 lb) and measuring 37 cm (15 in) in length). The majority of polecat–mink hybrids have skulls bearing greater similarities to those of polecats than to minks.

== Behavior ==
Hybrids can swim well like minks and burrow for food like polecats. They are very difficult to tame and breed: males are sterile; females, fertile.

Studies on the behavioural ecology of free ranging polecat–mink hybrids in the upper reaches of the Lovat River indicate that hybrids will stray from aquatic habitats more readily than pure minks, and will tolerate both parent species entering their territories, though the hybrid's larger size (especially the males') may deter intrusion. During the summer period, the diet of wild polecat–mink hybrids is more similar to that of the mink than to the polecat, as they feed predominantly on frogs. During the winter, their diet overlaps more with that of the polecat, and they eat a larger proportion of rodents than in the summer, although they still rely heavily on frogs and rarely scavenge off ungulate carcasses as the polecat does.

The breeding of these hybrids declined as European mink populations decreased.

== Captive crossbreeding ==
Originally bred for their fur (which was more valuable than that of either parent species), the first captive-bred polecat–mink hybrid was produced in 1978 by Soviet zoologist Dmitry Ternovsky of Novosibirsk.

== See also ==
- Polecat–ferret hybrid
