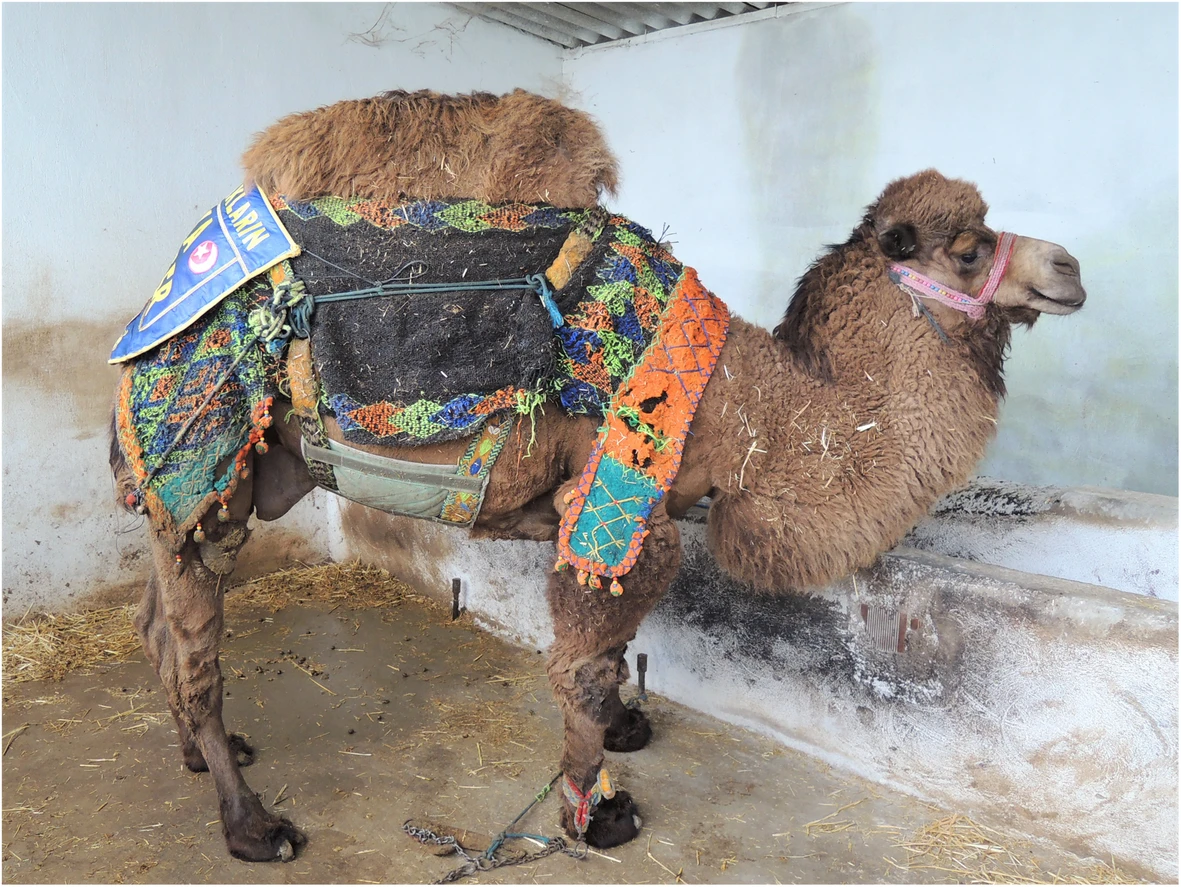
- F1 hybrid (tülü)

Conservation status
- Domesticated

Scientific classification
- Kingdom: Animalia
- Phylum: Chordata
- Class: Mammalia
- Infraclass: Placentalia
- Order: Artiodactyla
- Family: Camelidae
- Tribe: Camelini
- Genus: Camelus
- Species: C. bactrianus × C. dromedarius

= Hybrid camel =

Hybrid between a Bactrian camel and dromedary

A hybrid camel is a hybrid offspring resulting from the crossbreeding of a Bactrian camel (Camelus bactrianus) and a dromedary (Camelus dromedarius). Since ancient times, humans have intentionally exploited heterosis to obtain pack animals that are stronger, more cold-tolerant, and have greater load‑carrying capacity than either parent.

Historically, hybrid camels supported long‑distance trade along the Silk Road and military campaigns; today, systematic crossbreeding survives mainly in Turkey (for camel wrestling) and Kazakhstan (to improve milk, wool and meat production).

== History ==
Camel hybridisation has been practiced in the Near East and Central Asia for more than two thousand years. The most direct archaeological iconographic evidence comes from the Temple of Allat at Hatra (Iraq), where a 2nd‑century AD lintel frieze shows two rows of seated camels converging on a central king. The two leading animals, formerly identified as Bactrian camels, have been re‑identified as Bactrian × dromedary hybrids based on hump morphology (a single hump with a pronounced anterior notch) and the absence of the long hair typical of Bactrian camels on the neck, forearms and head.

This indicates that by the Parthian period, Hatraean merchants had mastered systematic crossbreeding and used the hybrid as a symbol of royal control over long‑distance trade.

The Ottoman army extensively used hybrid camels because they could carry 400–500 kg – more than twice the load of purebred camels – and tolerate cold, mountainous terrain. Historical sources report that F2 offspring (called kukirdi in Ottoman and jarbay in Central Asia) from intercrossing F1 hybrids are small, have deformed chests and joints, and are ill‑tempered; thus F1 × F1 matings are rarely performed.

== Genetics ==
Molecular genetics studies indicate that Bactrian camels and dromedaries diverged 4–8 million years ago, while the wild Bactrian camel (Camelus ferus) separated from the domestic Bactrian 0.7–1.5 million years ago.

Whole genome sequencing data show that hybrid camels possess the largest number of population‑specific single nucleotide polymorphisms (SNPs). In a comparison of five Kazakh hybrids, six Bactrians, four dromedaries and five wild Bactrian camels, out of 43,552,164 total SNPs, the hybrids had 3,271,083 private SNPs, far more than wild Bactrians (2,515,591), domestic Bactrians (1,244,694) or dromedaries (531,224).

Population structure analyses (ADMIXTURE and principal component analysis) and phylogenetic trees consistently show that hybrid camels are genetically closer to dromedaries – most likely because breeding practices frequently backcross hybrids to dromedaries to improve milk yield.

== Phenotypic characteristics ==
F1 hybrids display a series of recognisable external traits. The hump is single but greatly elongated, extending from the shoulder to the lumbar region, with a marked anterior notch or depression several centimetres deep – in Turkish called the “almond hump” (badem horgüç).

Unlike pure dromedaries, F1 hybrids have abundant long hair on the front edge of the neck, the top of the head and the forearms – traits inherited from the Bactrian ancestor, though usually less dense than in pure Bactrians. In hot seasons some hair may be shed, making phenotypic identification difficult.

Higher‑generation backcrosses (F4–F6) can be virtually indistinguishable from pure dromedaries in both hump shape and hair distribution; accurate identification then requires molecular markers or pedigree records.

== Hybridisation methods ==
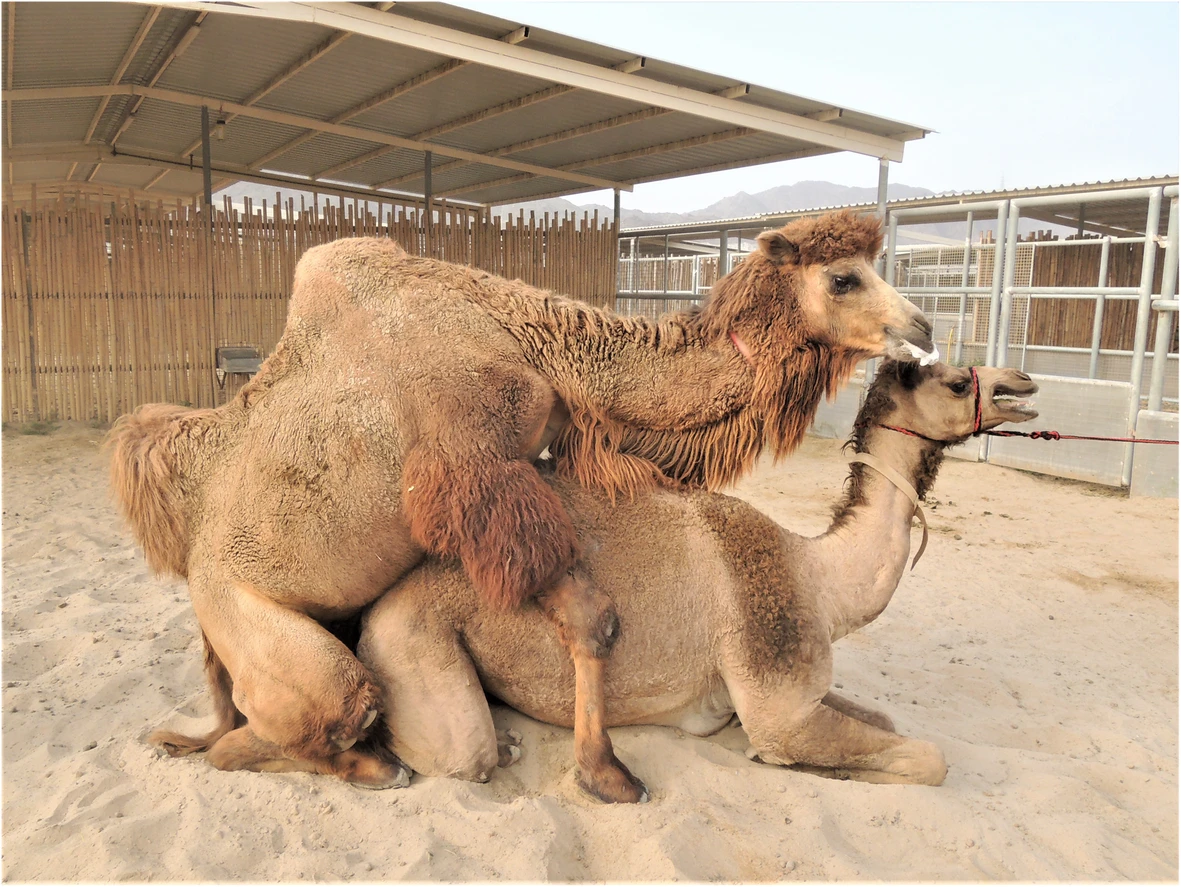
Male Bactrian camel mating with a female dromedary

Two basic cross‑breeding methods are distinguished according to the maternal and paternal species. The Turkmen method uses a male Bactrian camel × female dromedary, producing F1 females called iner‑maya and males called iner. The Kazakh method uses a male dromedary × female Bactrian camel, producing F1 females called nar‑maya and males called nar. Because the female Bactrian has a rear hump, short‑bodied dromedary males often cannot complete mating; therefore the Kazakh method requires specially selected long‑bodied dromedary breeds (e.g., the Arvana from Turkmenistan).

F1 hybrids surpass both parents in body size, growth rate and productive lifespan. Mean birth weight of F1 calves is 45.4 kg, compared to about 34.5 kg for pure dromedaries and Bactrians. Adult F1 hybrids can carry 400–500 kg – more than twice the load of purebreds. Since F1 × F1 matings produce inferior F2 individuals, further use is exclusively by backcrossing (F1 females mated to one of the parental species), while F1 males are usually castrated.

Milk production of hybrids is intermediate between the parent species, with a fat percentage higher than dromedaries but lower than Bactrians: pure dromedary milk averages 3.52% fat, pure Bactrian 5.34%, while F1 hybrids yield about 4.0–4.5% fat. Wool yield increases with the proportion of Bactrian genes; higher dromedary ancestry reduces yield. Gestation length is also intermediate (dromedary 417–425 days, Bactrian ~442 days) and is shortened by dromedary genes.

In Kazakhstan, decades of systematic breeding have produced more than 20 hybrid types with different generations and genetic compositions. Among them, the high‑generation backcross “kurt 4” (≈96.8% dromedary ancestry) was interbred to stabilise a new breed phenotypically identical to the dromedary but with higher milk fat – the “Kazakh dromedary”.

== Hybrid types ==
The following table lists the main hybrid types documented in the literature, including their names, parent combinations, generation and Bactrian ancestry proportion, covering common forms from Turkey and Kazakhstan.

Main hybrid types of Bactrian camel × dromedary
Name (region)	Generation	Sire	Dam	Bactrian ancestry (%)	Remarks
tülü / besrek / maya (Turkey)	F1	Bactrian	Dromedary	50	Used in camel wrestling; deep anterior notch on hump, hair on neck and forearms
tavsi (Turkey)	F2	Bactrian	F1 maya	75	Cold‑tolerant, used in highland areas
teke (Turkey)	F2	F1 tülü	Dromedary	25	Heat‑tolerant, used in southern Turkey
yegen (Turkey)	F2	Dromedary	F1 maya	25	Poor performance, rarely used
kertelez (Turkey)	F3	Bactrian	F2 teke	62.5	Adapted to cold mountainous Taurus region
iner / iner‑maya (Kazakhstan)	F1	Bactrian	Dromedary	50	Turkmen‑method F1, slightly dromedary‑like appearance
nar / nar‑maya (Kazakhstan)	F1	Dromedary	Bactrian	50	Kazakh‑method F1, more hair on neck and forearms
kurt 1 (Kazakhstan)	F2	Dromedary	iner‑maya	25	Milk‑oriented, reduced body hair
kurt 4 (Kazakhstan)	F5	Dromedary (repeated backcross)	previous hybrid	~3.1	Used to create the Kazakh dromedary
kospak 1 (Kazakhstan)	F2	Bactrian	nar‑maya	75	Cold‑tolerant, wool‑oriented
kospak 3 (Kazakhstan)	F4	Bactrian (repeated backcross)	previous hybrid	~93.8	Nearly pure Bactrian phenotype
kez‑nar 1 (Kazakhstan)	F3	Dromedary	kospak 1	37.5	Dual‑purpose (milk/meat), good adaptability
kez‑nar 3 (Kazakhstan)	F5	Dromedary	kospak 3	~46.9	High milk yield
baytur (Kazakhstan)	F5	Kazakh dromedary	kurt‑nar 2	~28.1	Early maturing, good meat production
samnak (Kazakhstan)	F5	Kazakh dromedary	ardas	~15.6	High live weight
arada (Kazakhstan)	F4	arada‑nar × arada‑nar	(inter se)	12.5	New breed, 87.5% dromedary ancestry

== See also ==
- Camelus knoblochi
