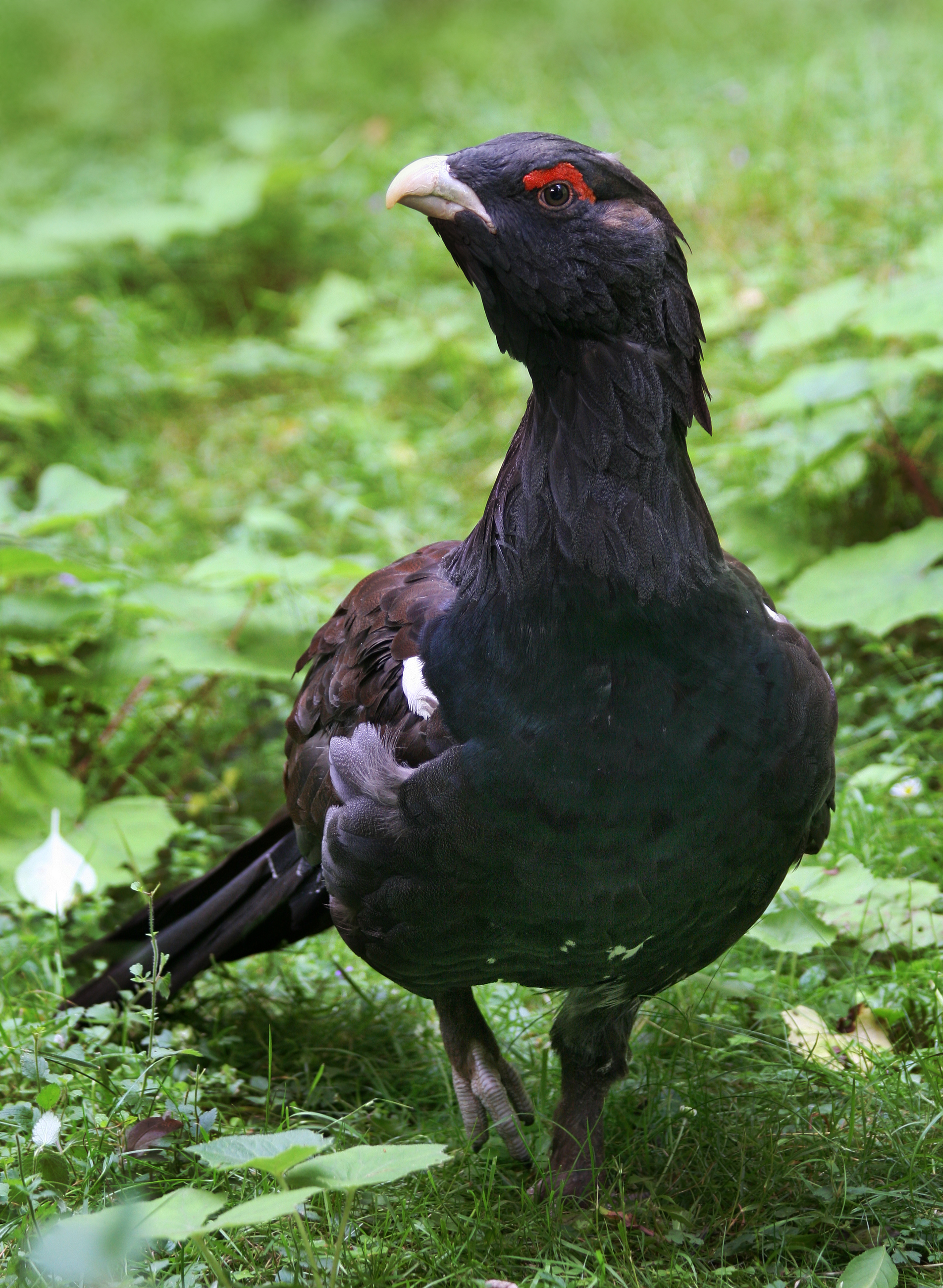
- Western capercaillie (Tetrao urogallus)

Scientific classification
- Kingdom: Animalia
- Phylum: Chordata
- Class: Aves
- Order: Galliformes
- Family: Phasianidae
- Tribe: Tetraonini
- Genus: Tetrao; Linnaeus, 1758

Type species
- Tetrao urogallus Linnaeus, 1758

Species
- Tetrao urogalloides Tetrao urogallus

= Tetrao =

Tetrao Temporal range: Early Pliocene to recent

Genus of birds

Tetrao is a genus of birds in the grouse subfamily known as capercaillies UK: /kʰæpəʳˈkʰɛɪli/. They are some of the largest grouses and can be found in the forested areas of the Eurasian Palearctic.

Feathers from the bird were used to decorate the characteristic hat of the bersaglieri, an Italian ace infantry formation. In the United Kingdom, the birds are at risk of extinction. Since 2026 they have been featured on the reverse of the ten pence coin.

== Taxonomy ==
The genus Tetrao was introduced in 1758 by the Swedish naturalist Carl Linnaeus in the tenth edition of his Systema Naturae. The genus name is the Latin word for a game bird, probably a black grouse. The black grouse was included by Linnaeus in the genus Tetrao but is now placed in the genus Lyrurus. The type species was designated as the western capercaillie (Tetrao urogallus) by George Robert Gray in 1840.

=== Species ===
The genus contains two extant species:

Genus Tetrao – Linnaeus, 1758 – two species
Common name	Scientific name and subspecies	Range	Size and ecology	IUCN status and estimated population
Western capercaillie Male Female	Tetrao urogallus Linnaeus, 1758 Eight subspecies: T. u. cantabricus (Castroviejo, 1967); T. u. aquitanicus (Ingram, 1915); T. u. crassirostris (C.L. Brehm, 1831); T. u. rudolfi (Dombrowski, 1912); T. u. urogallus (Linnaeus, 1758); T. u. karelicus (Lönnberg, 1924); T. u. lonnbergi (Snigirevski, 1957); T. u. pleskei (Stegmann, 1926); T. u. obsoletus (Snigerewski, 1937); T. u. volgensis (Buturlin, 1907); T. u. uralensis (Nazarov, 1886); T. u. taczanowskii (Stejneger, 1885)	Europe to western Russia	Size: Habitat: Diet:	LC
Black-billed capercaillie Male Female	Tetrao urogalloides Middendorff, 1853 Two subspecies: T. u. kamtschaticus (Kittlitz, 1858); T. u. urogalloides (nominate) (Middendorff, 1853)	Eastern Russia as well as parts of northern Mongolia and China	Size: Habitat: Diet:	LC

The fossil record of this genus is extensive:

- †Tetrao conjugens Mourer-Chauvire, 1993 (Early Pliocene of C Europe)
- †Tetrao rhodopensis Bojev, 1998 (Early Pliocene of Dorkovo, Bulgaria)
- †Tetrao partium Kretzoi, 1962 (Early Pliocene - Early Pleistocene of SE Europe)
- †Tetrao macropus Jánossy, 1976 (Late Pliocene - Early Pleistocene of Hungary)
- †Tetrao praeurogallus Jánossy, 1969 (Early - Middle Pleistocene of E Europe)

== Conservation ==
A national survey of capercaillie numbers in Scotland estimated that there were 532 capercaillie in 2021/22, a reduction of 52% on the estimated 2015/16 population. The Scottish Government has adopted a Capercaillie Emergency Plan covering the period 2025 to 2030, led by the Cairngorms National Park Authority and NatureScot, and aiming to reverse the long-term decline in their numbers.
