= Lehtsaare Nature Reserve =

Protected area in Estonia

- Location within Estonia
- Location: Estonia
- Coordinates: 58°32′N 25°19′E
- Area: 380 ha (940 acres)
- Established: 1992 (2017)

Lehtsaare Nature Reserve is a nature reserve which is located in Viljandi County, Estonia.

The area of the nature reserve is 380 ha.

The protected area was founded in 1992 to protect the habitat for western capercaillie.
