= Kirikuraba Nature Reserve =

Protected area in Estonia

- Location within Estonia
- Location: Estonia
- Coordinates: 58°35′N 26°22′E
- Area: 447 hectares (1,100 acres)
- Established: 2005 (2013)

Kirikuraba Nature Reserve is a nature reserve which is located in Jõgeva County, Estonia.

The area of the nature reserve is 447 hectares (1,100 acres)

The protected area was founded in 2005 on the basis of the Kirikuraba protected area for western capercaillie (Estonian: Kirikuraba metsise püsielupaik).
