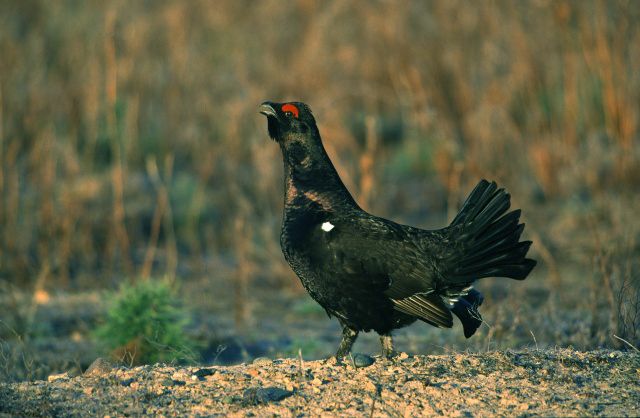

Scientific classification
- Kingdom: Animalia
- Phylum: Chordata
- Class: Aves
- Order: Galliformes
- Family: Phasianidae
- Subfamily: Phasianinae
- Tribe: Tetraonini
- Hybrid: Tetrao urogallus × Lyrurus tetrix

= Rackelhahn =

Hybrid bird

The rackelhahn or rackelwild is a hybrid between the western capercaillie (Tetrao urogallus) and the black grouse (Lyrurus tetrix).
