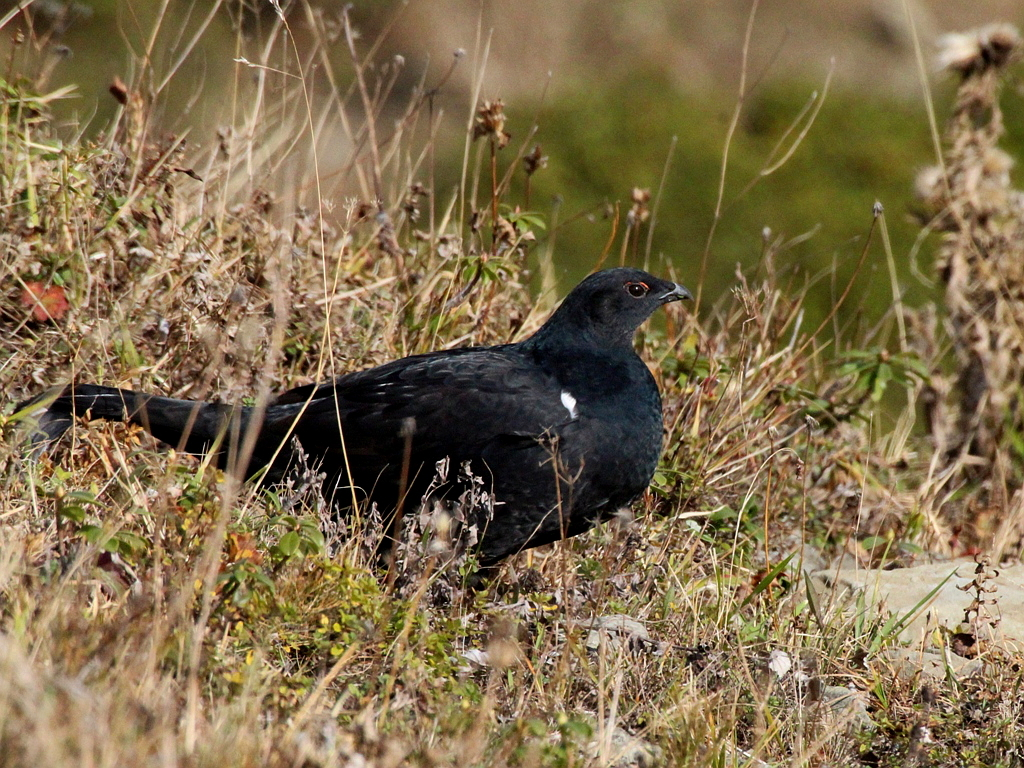
- in Russia

Conservation status
- Near Threatened (IUCN 3.1)

Scientific classification
- Kingdom: Animalia
- Phylum: Chordata
- Class: Aves
- Order: Galliformes
- Family: Phasianidae
- Genus: Lyrurus
- Species: L. mlokosiewiczi

Binomial name
- Lyrurus mlokosiewiczi (Taczanowski, 1875)

Synonyms
- Tetrao mlokosiewiczi

= Caucasian grouse =

Species of bird

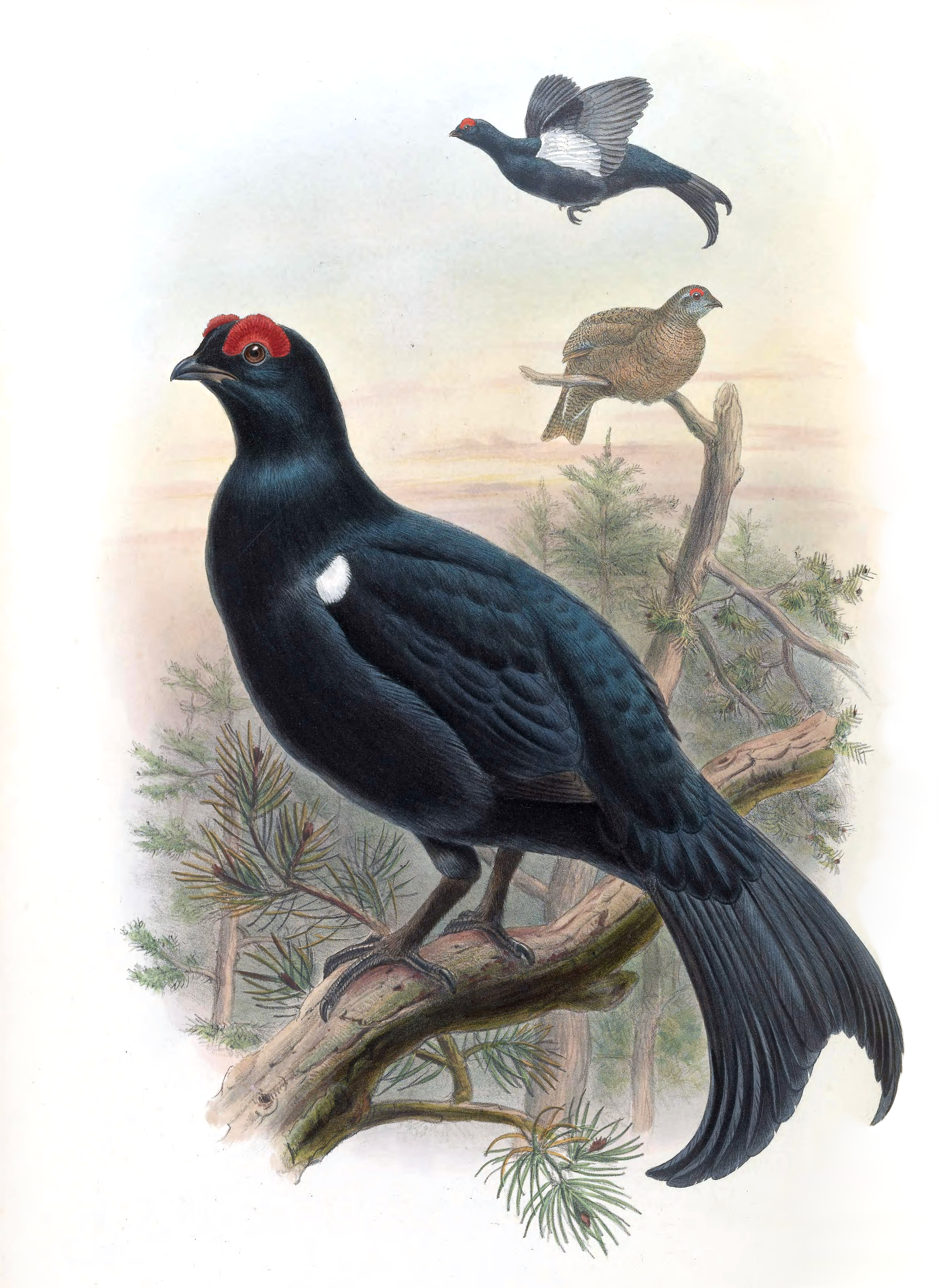
Illustration

The Caucasian grouse or Caucasian black grouse (Lyrurus mlokosiewiczi) is a large bird in the grouse tribe. It is closely related to the black grouse (L. tetrix).

== Description ==
As with many gamebirds, the cock (male) is larger than the hen (female), measuring 50–55 cm compared to her length of 37–42 cm. The cock is very distinctive, with all-black plumage, apart from red eyebrows, and a long, deeply forked tail. The female Caucasian grouse is grey with dark barring, and has a cackling call.

== Distribution and habitat ==
It occurs in extreme southeastern Europe and adjacent regions. The scientific name of this bird commemorates the Polish naturalist Ludwik Mlokosiewicz. The Caucasian grouse is a sedentary species, breeding in the Caucasus and Pontic Mountains of northeast Turkey and Iran on open slopes with low Rhododendron or other scrubs but in proximity to deciduous broad-leaf forest.

== Breeding ==
They have a group display or lek in May and June. Unlike the male Eurasian black grouse, the Caucasian grouse display is almost mute but for a thin whistling of the cock fluttering his wings as he leaps and turns in the air, producing a flash of white as the underwing feathers are briefly revealed. The hen lays up to ten eggs in a ground scrape and takes all responsibility for nesting and caring for the chicks, as is typical with gamebirds.

== Conservation ==
It is perhaps the least-studied of all grouse in the world, and it was formerly classified as Data Deficient by the IUCN. Recent research shows that it is declining to some extent, and it is consequently listed as a Near Threatened species in 2008 with an estimated population of 30,203–63,034 worldwide in 2010. Conservation efforts have included encouraging ecotourism as a way to promote awareness of the bird and its habitat.
