= Tetrao macropus =

Tetrao macropus Temporal range: Late Pliocene

Scientific classification
- Domain: Eukaryota
- Kingdom: Animalia
- Phylum: Chordata
- Class: Aves
- Order: Galliformes
- Family: Phasianidae
- Genus: Tetrao
- Species: †T. macropus

Binomial name
- †Tetrao macropus Jánossy, 1976

Extinct species of bird

Tetrao macropus is an extinct species of Tetrao that lived during the Piacenzian stage of the Pliocene epoch.

== Distribution ==
Tetrao macropus fossils are known from Hungary.
