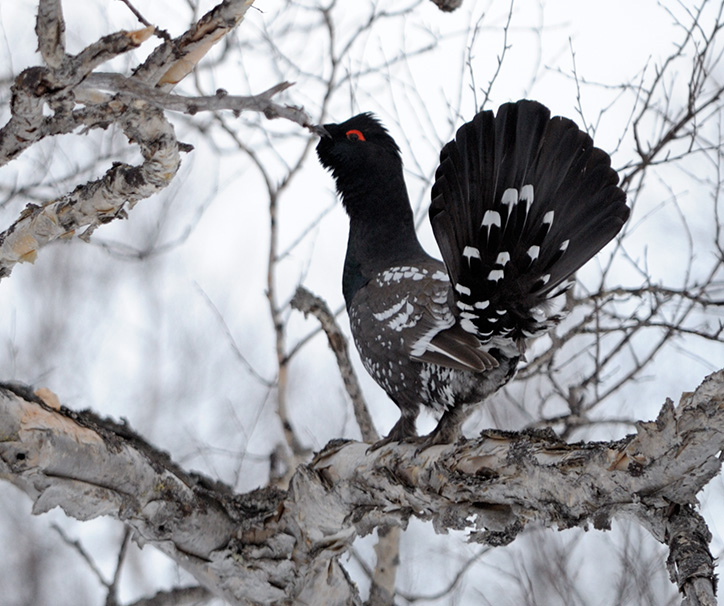

Conservation status
- Least Concern (IUCN 3.1)

Scientific classification
- Kingdom: Animalia
- Phylum: Chordata
- Class: Aves
- Order: Galliformes
- Family: Phasianidae
- Genus: Tetrao
- Species: T. urogalloides

Binomial name
- Tetrao urogalloides Middendorff, 1853

Synonyms
- Tetrao parvirostris

= Black-billed capercaillie =

Species of bird

The black-billed capercaillie (Tetrao urogalloides) is a large grouse species closely related to the more widespread western capercaillie. It is a sedentary species that breeds in the larch taiga forests of eastern Siberia as well as parts of northern Mongolia and China. In the far west of its distribution, the black-billed capercaillie has been known to hybridize with the western capercaillie. Compared to its western cousin, the black-billed capercaillie is also more adaptable to open habitat, given the larch forests it lives in are usually less dense than other taiga communities. Thus, they tend to avoid thick coniferous forests. They are primarily herbivorous, feeding on twigs, buds, leaves, shoots, and berries of various plants. However, their diet in the warmer months includes some insects like caterpillars, larvae, ants and midges.

This species is also known as the eastern capercaillie, Siberian capercaillie, spotted capercaillie or (in Russian) "stone capercaillie".

== Description ==
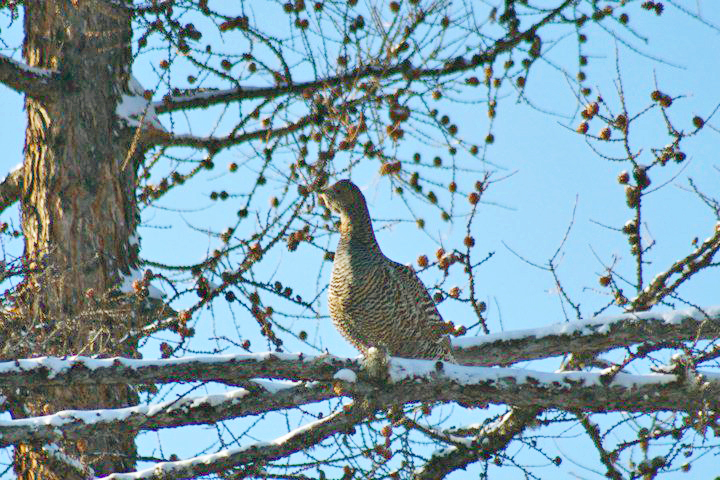
Female

A male black-billed capercaillie has an average length of about 89–97 cm (35–38 in) and weighs 3.4–4.6 kg (7.5–10.1 lb), with females measuring around 69–75 cm (27–30 in) and weighing 1.7–2.2 kg (3.7–4.9 lb). Their wingspan stretches approximately 75–115 cm (30–45 in) long. Compared to the western capercaillie, it is slightly smaller in size with a slimmer body profile and longer neck, has a black beak (hence its name) instead of being horn-colored, and a longer, more spatulate tail. The eastern capercaillie has a somewhat glossy bluish-black head and neck down to a metallic turquoise breast. Distinct white markings at the tips of its upper and undertail coverts, as well as the wing coverts and flanks, give this grouse the nickname 'spotted capercaillie'. The female is similar to that of its western counterpart, except that its plumage is grayer overall with more heavily scaled underparts, lacks a solid rufous chest unlike the western capercaillie, and has noticeably larger white spots on its wing and tail coverts.

== Behavior ==
In the spring, from dawn until late morning, male capercaillies display by fanning out their tails, puffing their chest feathers out, lowering their wings, and angling their heads upward with an open beak to defend their space from other males and win over the mating rights of females. The size of the males' territories are usually 30 m × 30 m (98 ft × 98 ft), similar to black grouse territories. A group of hens will carefully squat with drooping wings, while the lekking male is present to signal that they are ready for breeding. Their castanets-like call, much louder than the western capercaillie, can be heard up to 1.5 km (0.93 mi) away. It consists of a series of loud repeating clicks ascending in tempo. Other performances used to attract females involve flutter flights. They jump off the ground to heights of 2 m (6 ft 7 in) or to distances of 8–10 m (26–33 ft), rapidly beating their wings during takeoff and landing, generating a thundering flurry that resonates through the dense stands of conifers.

== Diet ==
The black-billed capercaillie is primarily herbivorous. During the winter months, when food is scarce, the black-billed capercaillie primarily feeds on twigs, shoots, and buds from various plant species, as well as the fruit of Rosa acicularis (commonly known as the prickly wild rose). Their main source of twigs and buds is the Siberian larch (Larix dahurica). The male capercaillie seasonally trim young larch trees, stunting their vertical growth. This causes the trees to not only be significantly shorter but also significantly thinner. This creates a unique forest of "dwarf larches," often referred to as a "garden" or "park forest." These gardens are used by the males for foraging. Since the male capercaillie are notably larger, they are unable to perch on branches smaller than 2 cm in diameter, so they tend to forage on the ground. On the other hand, female capercaillie prefer foraging up in the trees. During the winter months, the females stay in higher-altitude, young, denser forests to forage. As the snow begins to melt, the capercaillie shift their diet to include new green shoots and leaves, insects such as caterpillars, larvae, ants, and midges, as well as various berries. This dietary shift, which lasts from spring to autumn, helps female capercaillie gain weight in preparation for reproduction. Flocks will sometimes travel to the edge of the forest to feed on the new sprouting plants.

== Status ==
The black-billed capercaillie is classified as Least Concern on the IUCN Red List due to its wide range across Siberia. However, in China, the species is endangered and classified as a first-class state protection animal (Category I). Over the past century, the black-billed capercaillie population in China has experienced a significant decline. Research conducted by the School of Nature Conservation in Beijing revealed a 35.25% reduction in the species' range in northeast China, since 1970. Several factors have contributed to this decline, including climate change, deforestation, overhunting, and the expansion of urban and agricultural areas. Many of these pressures are a result of China's growing human population, which has led to the expansion of urban areas and farms further north. Additionally, some data has shown that climate change is pushing the species to higher altitudes. In response, China has implemented various measures to protect the black-billed capercaillie and other wildlife. These include efforts such as the Natural Forest Protection Project, the Law of People's Republic of China on the protection of Wildlife project and a policy aimed at restoring farmland to forest. These conservation efforts have proven effective, as recent data indicates that the species' decline is stabilizing.

== Taxonomy ==
The black-billed capercaillie has two recognized subspecies:

- T. u. kamtschaticus (Kittlitz, 1858) - the Kamchatka peninsula
- T. u. urogalloides (nominate) (Middendorff, 1853) - northeastern Asia
