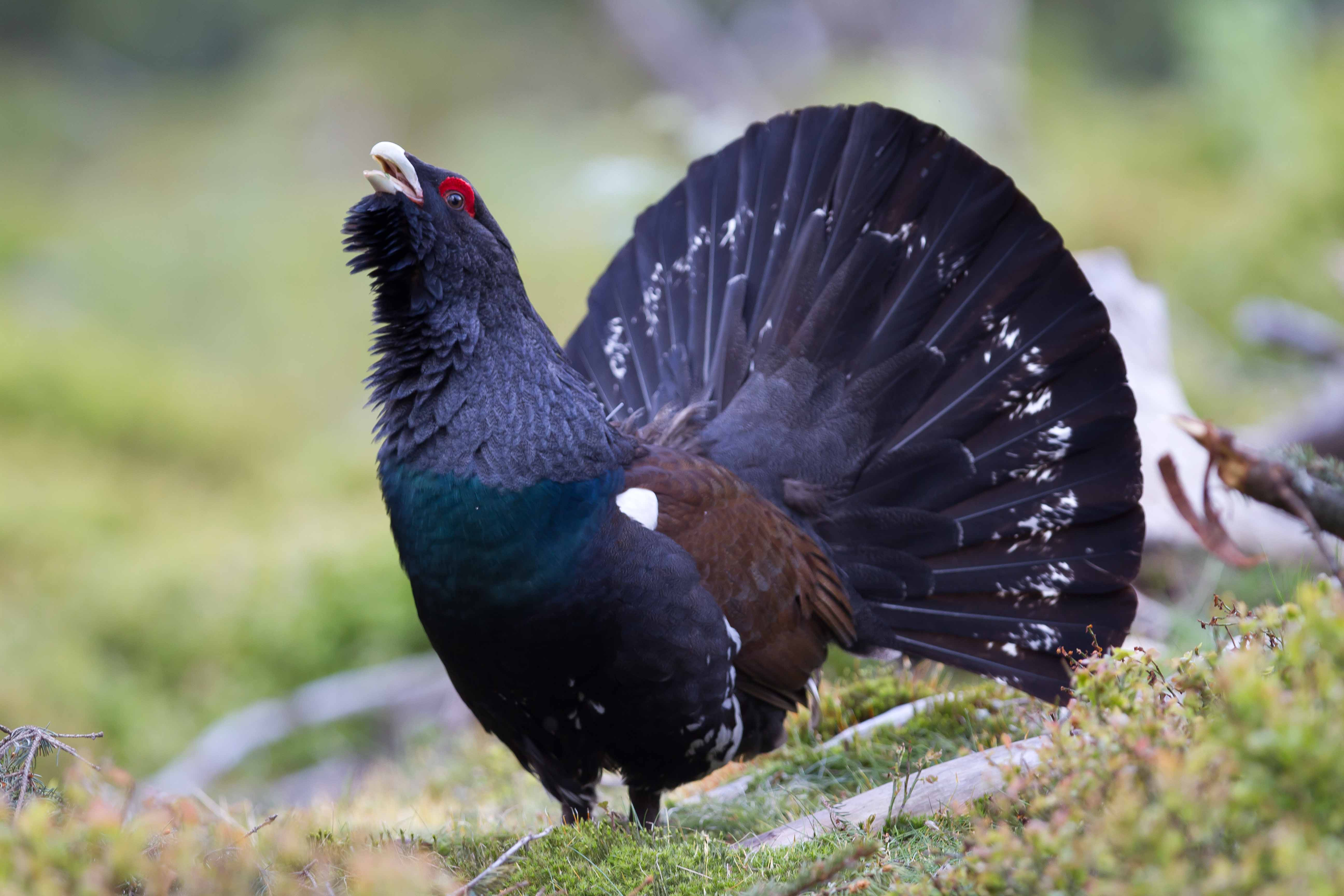
- Male (cock)
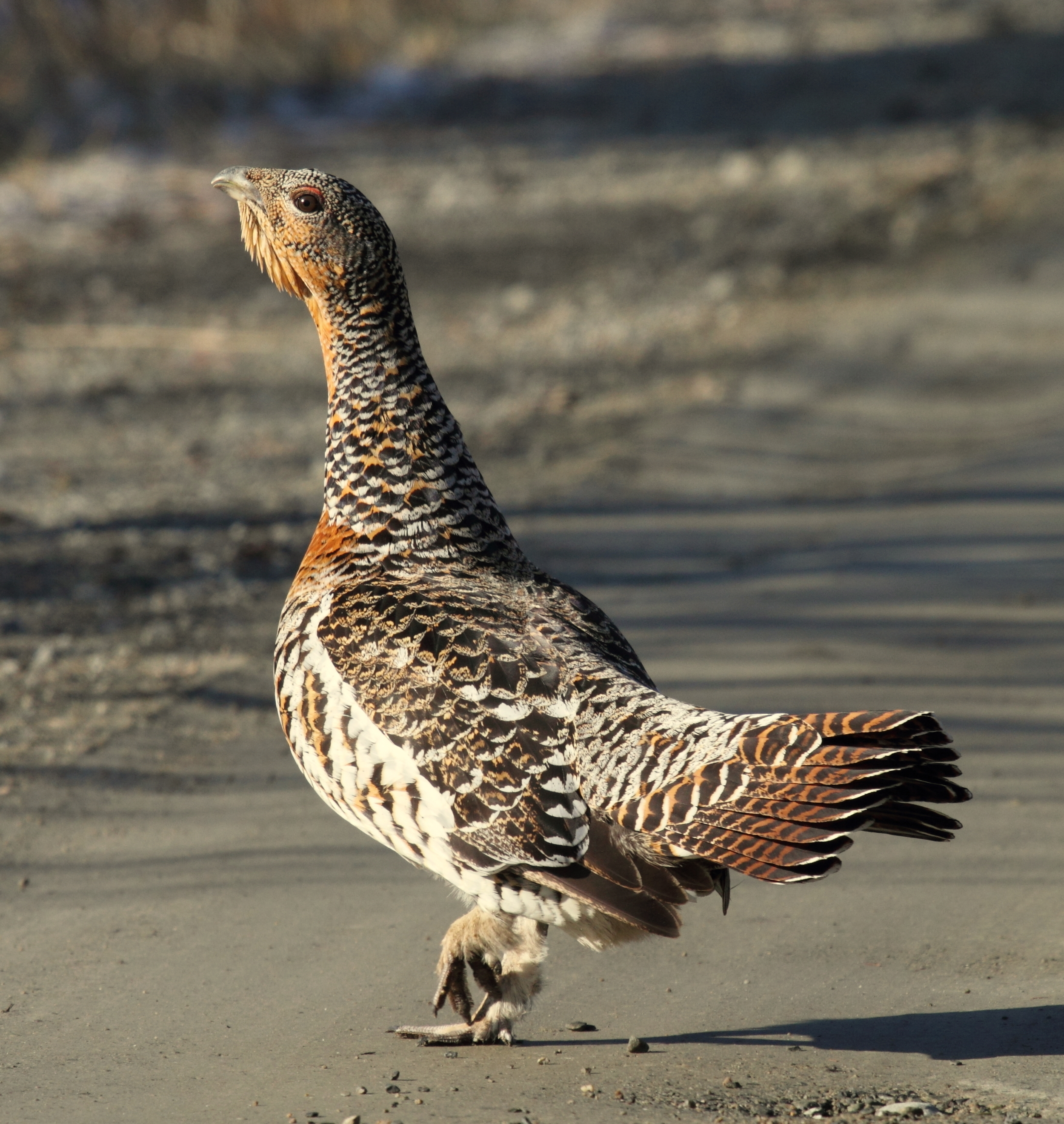
- Female (hen)

Conservation status
- Least Concern (IUCN 3.1)

Scientific classification
- Kingdom: Animalia
- Phylum: Chordata
- Class: Aves
- Order: Galliformes
- Family: Phasianidae
- Genus: Tetrao
- Species: T. urogallus

Binomial name
- Tetrao urogallus Linnaeus, 1758
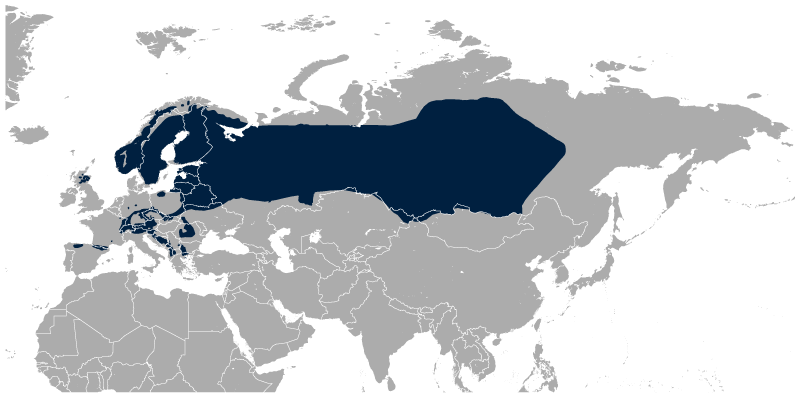
- Range of the western capercaillie
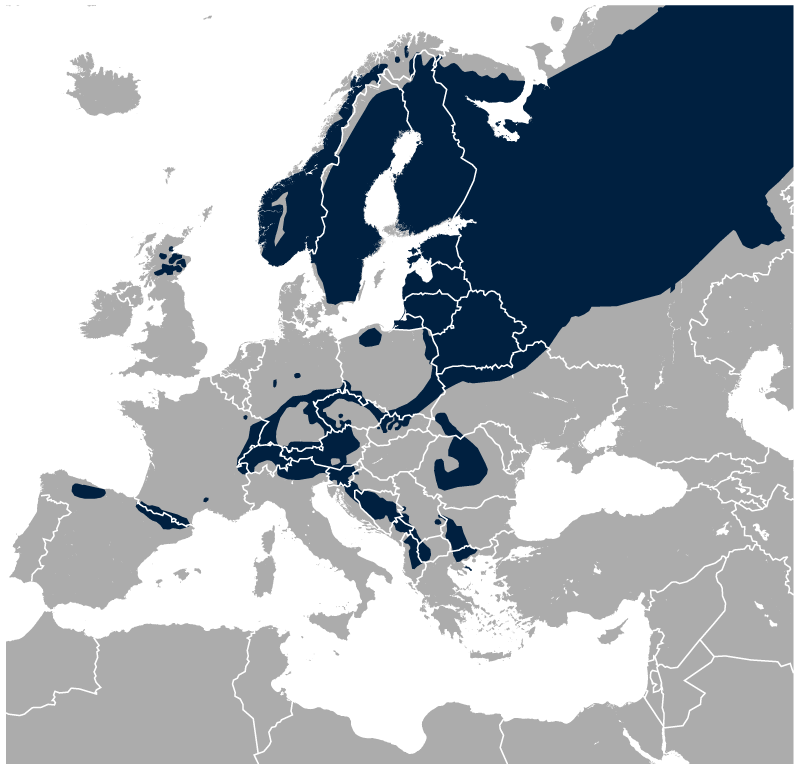
- Distribution in Europe

= Western capercaillie =

Species of bird

The western capercaillie (Tetrao urogallus), also known as the Eurasian capercaillie, wood grouse, heather cock, cock-of-the-woods, or simply capercaillie /ˌkæpərˈkeɪl(j)i/, is a heavy member of the grouse tribe and the largest of all extant grouse species. Found across Europe and the Palearctic, this primarily-ground-dwelling forest grouse is renowned for its courtship display. The bird shows extreme sexual dimorphism, with males nearly twice the size of females. The global population is listed as "least concern" under the IUCN, although the populations of central Europe are declining and fragmented, or possibly extirpated.

The western capercaillie is one of two living species under the genus Tetrao, which also includes the lesser-known black-billed capercaillie.

== Taxonomy ==
The western capercaillie was formally described in 1758 by the Swedish naturalist Carl Linnaeus in the tenth edition of his Systema Naturae under its current binomial name Tetrao urogallus. Linnaeus specified the type locality as Europe but this is now restricted to Sweden. The genus name is a Latin word that was used for both the black grouse and the western capercaillie. The specific epithet urogallus is a Neo-Latin partial homophone of German Auerhuhn, a western capercaillie. The word had been used in 1555 by the Swiss naturalist Conrad Gessner in his Historiae animalium.

The common name capercaillie is a corruption of the Scottish Gaelic capall coille (Scottish Gaelic pronunciation: [kʰaʰpəɫ̪ˈkʰɤʎə]) "Horse of the woodland". The Scots borrowing is spelled capercailzie (the Scots use of z represents an archaic spelling with yogh and is silent; (Note: There exists a spelling pronunciation /-lzi/.) see Mackenzie (surname)). The current spelling was standardised by William Yarrell in 1843.

Its closest relative is the black-billed capercaillie (Tetrao urogalloides), which breeds in the larch taiga forests of eastern Russia and parts of northern Mongolia and China.

=== Subspecies ===
The western capercaillie has 8 recognized subspecies:

- T. u. cantabricus (Castroviejo, 1967) - northwestern Spain
- T. u. aquitanicus (Ingram, 1915) - Pyrenees of Spain and France
- T. u. crassirostris (C.L. Brehm, 1831) - Alps to Estonia
- T. u. rudolfi (Dombrowski, 1912) - Bulgaria to southwestern Ukraine
- T. u. urogallus (Linnaeus, 1758) - Scandinavia and Scotland
- T. u. karelicus (Lönnberg, 1924) - Finland and Karelia
- T. u. lonnbergi (Snigirevski, 1957) - Kola Peninsula
- T. u. pleskei (Stegmann, 1926) - Belarus (Russia)
- T. u. obsoletus (Snigerewski, 1937) - northern European Russia
- T. u. volgensis (Buturlin, 1907) - found in southeastern European Russia
- T. u. uralensis (Nazarov, 1886) - found in the Urals and western Siberia
- T. u. taczanowskii (Stejneger, 1885) - central Siberia to Altai Mountains (northwest Mongolia and eastern Kazakhstan)

Subspecies of the western capercaillie show increasing amounts of white on the underparts of males distributed west to east, almost wholly black with only a few white spots underneath in western and central Europe to nearly pure white in Siberia, where the black-billed capercaillie is located. There is less variation in the females of this species.

A native Scottish population of western capercaillie which became extinct between 1770 and 1785 was probably a distinct subspecies, although it was never formally described as such. The western capercaillie found in Scotland is an introduced population of the nominate subspecies urogallus.

=== Hybrids ===
Western capercaillies are known to hybridise occasionally with black grouse (these hybrids being known by the German name Rackelhahn) and the closely related black-billed capercaillie.

== Description ==
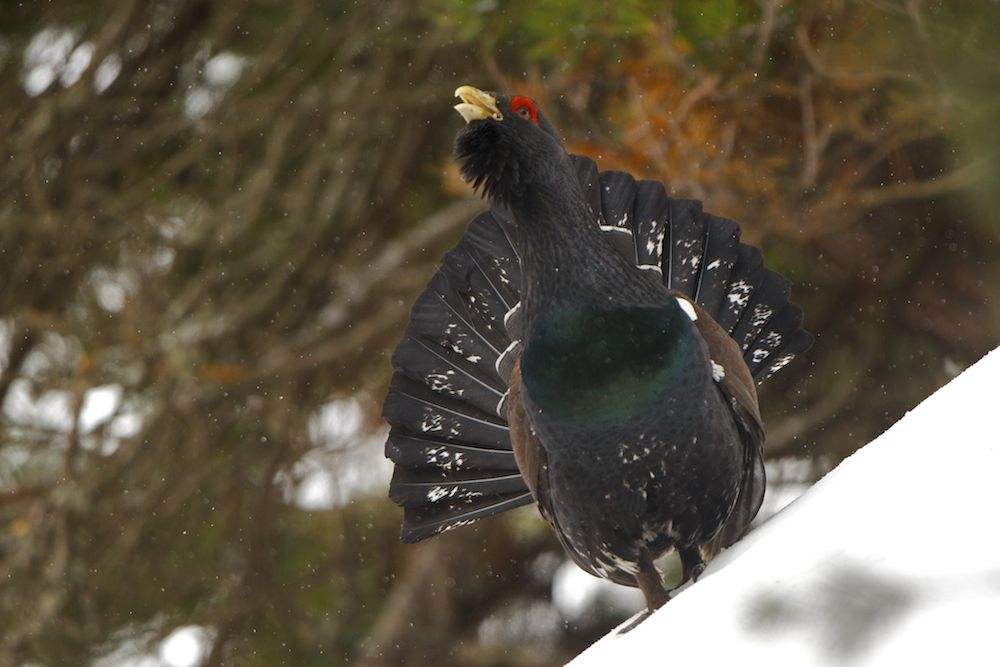
Cock singing during courting season in the Spanish Pyrenees

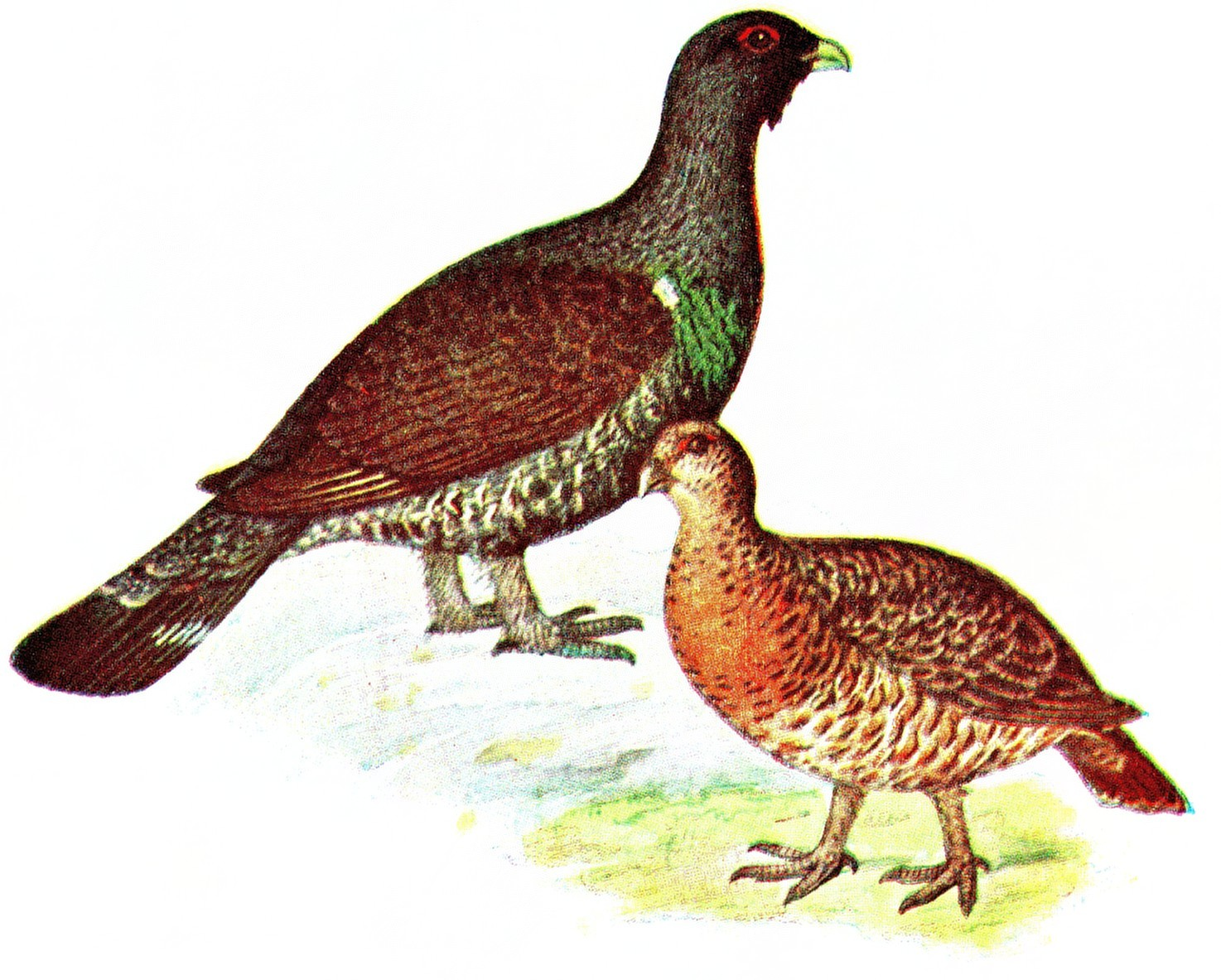
Male and female

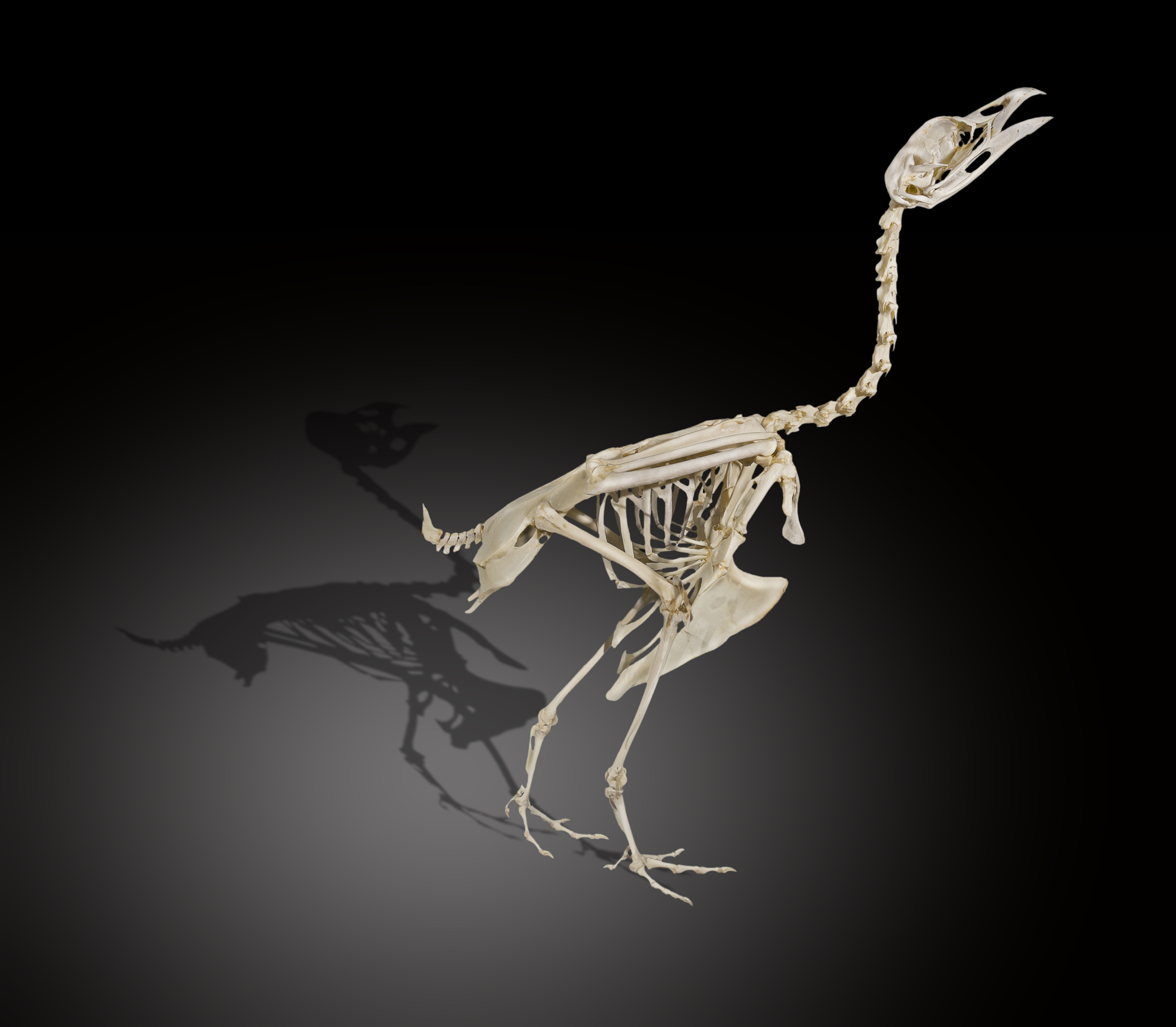
Skeleton of Tetrao urogallus

Male and female western capercaillie can easily be differentiated by their size and colouration. The cock is much bigger than the hen. It is one of the most sexually dimorphic in size of living bird species, only exceeded by the larger types of bustards and a select few members of the pheasant family.

Cocks (males) typically range from 74 to 85 centimetres (29 to 33 in) in length with wingspan of 90 to 125 cm (35 to 49 in) and an average weight of 4.1 kg (9 lb 1 oz). The largest wild cocks can attain a length of 100 cm (40 in) and weight of 6.7 kg (14 lb 12 oz). The largest specimen recorded in captivity had a weight of 7.2 kg (15 lb 14 oz). The weight of 75 wild cocks was found to range from 3.6 to 5.05 kg (7 lb 15 oz to 11 lb 2 oz). The body feathers are dark grey to dark brown, while the breast feathers are dark metallic green. The belly and undertail coverts vary from black to white depending on race (see below).

The hen (female) is much smaller, weighing about half as much as the cock. The capercaillie hen's body from beak to tail is approximately 54–64 cm (21–25 in) long, the wingspan is 70 cm (28 in) and weighs 1.5–2.5 kg (3 lb 5 oz – 5 lb 8 oz), with an average of 1.8 kg (3 lb 15 oz). Feathers on the upper parts are brown with black and silver barring; on the underside they are more light and buffish yellow.

Both sexes have a white spot on the wing bow. They have feathered legs, especially in the cold season, for protection against cold. Their toe rows of small, elongated horn tacks provide a snowshoe effect that led to the German family name "Rauhfußhühner", literally translated as "rough-footed hens".

These so-called "courting tracks" make a clear track in the snow. The sexes can be distinguished very easily by the size of their footprints.

There is a bright red spot of naked skin above each eye. In German hunters' language, these are the so-called "roses".

The small chicks resemble the hen in their cryptic colouration, which is a passive protection against predators. Additionally, they wear black crown feathers. At an age of about three months, in late summer, they moult gradually towards the adult plumage of cocks and hens. The eggs are about the same size and form as chicken eggs, but are more speckled with brown spots.

== Distribution and habitat ==
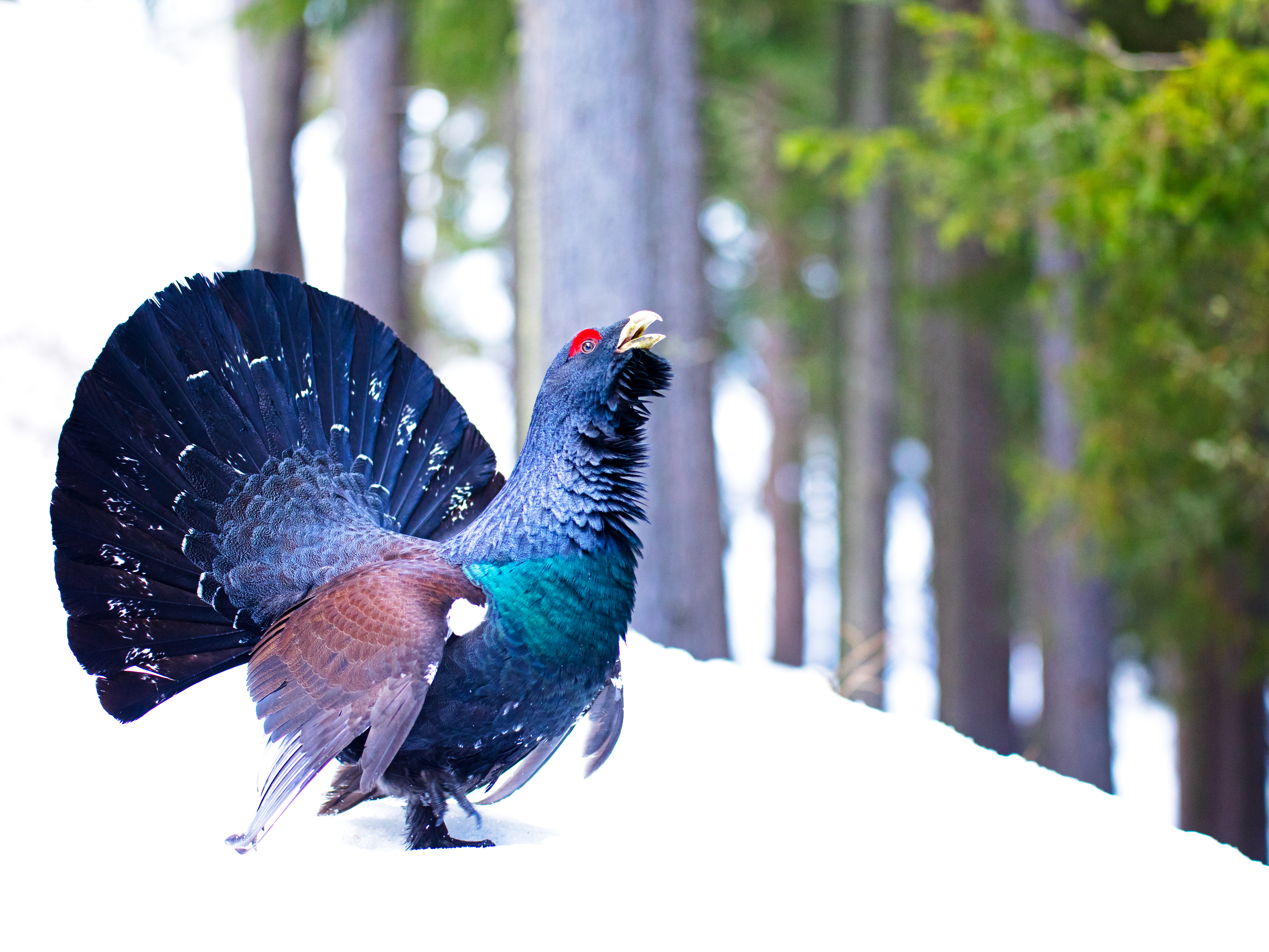
Male capercaillie in Stelvio National Park, Italy.

The capercaillie is a non-migratory sedentary species, breeding across northern parts of Europe and the Palearctic in mature conifer forests with diverse species composition and a relatively open canopy structure.

A capercaillie in the coat of arms of the Central Finland region. It is also the official regional bird.

At one time it was present in all the taiga forests of the Palearctic in the cold temperate latitudes and the coniferous forest belt in the mountain ranges of warm temperate Europe. The Scottish population became extinct, but has been reintroduced from the Swedish population. In Germany it is on the "Red List" as a species threatened by extinction and is no longer found in the lower mountainous areas of Bavaria; in the Bavarian Forest, the Black Forest and the Harz mountains, numbers of surviving western capercaillies decline even under massive efforts to breed them in captivity and release them into the wild. In Switzerland, they are found in the Swiss Alps and in the Jura. In France, the biggest population is in the Pyrenees, while small populations struggle to thrive in the Jura and the Vosges Mountains. Less than 20 birds can also be found in the Cévennes, but this population is on the edge of extinction. They are extinct in the French Alps, but are present in the Austrian and Italian Alps. In Ireland the species was common until the 17th century, but was extirpated in the 18th century. In Norway, Sweden, Finland, Russia and Romania populations are large, and it is a common bird to see in forested regions; especially in Central Finland, where it occurs in the coat of arms of the region and is also a regional bird.

The most serious threats to the species are habitat degradation, particularly conversion of diverse native forest into often single-species timber plantations, and to birds colliding with fences erected to keep deer out of young plantations. Increased numbers of small predators that prey on capercaillies (e.g., red fox) due to the loss of large predators who control smaller carnivores (e.g., gray wolf, brown bear) cause problems in some areas.

=== Status and conservation ===
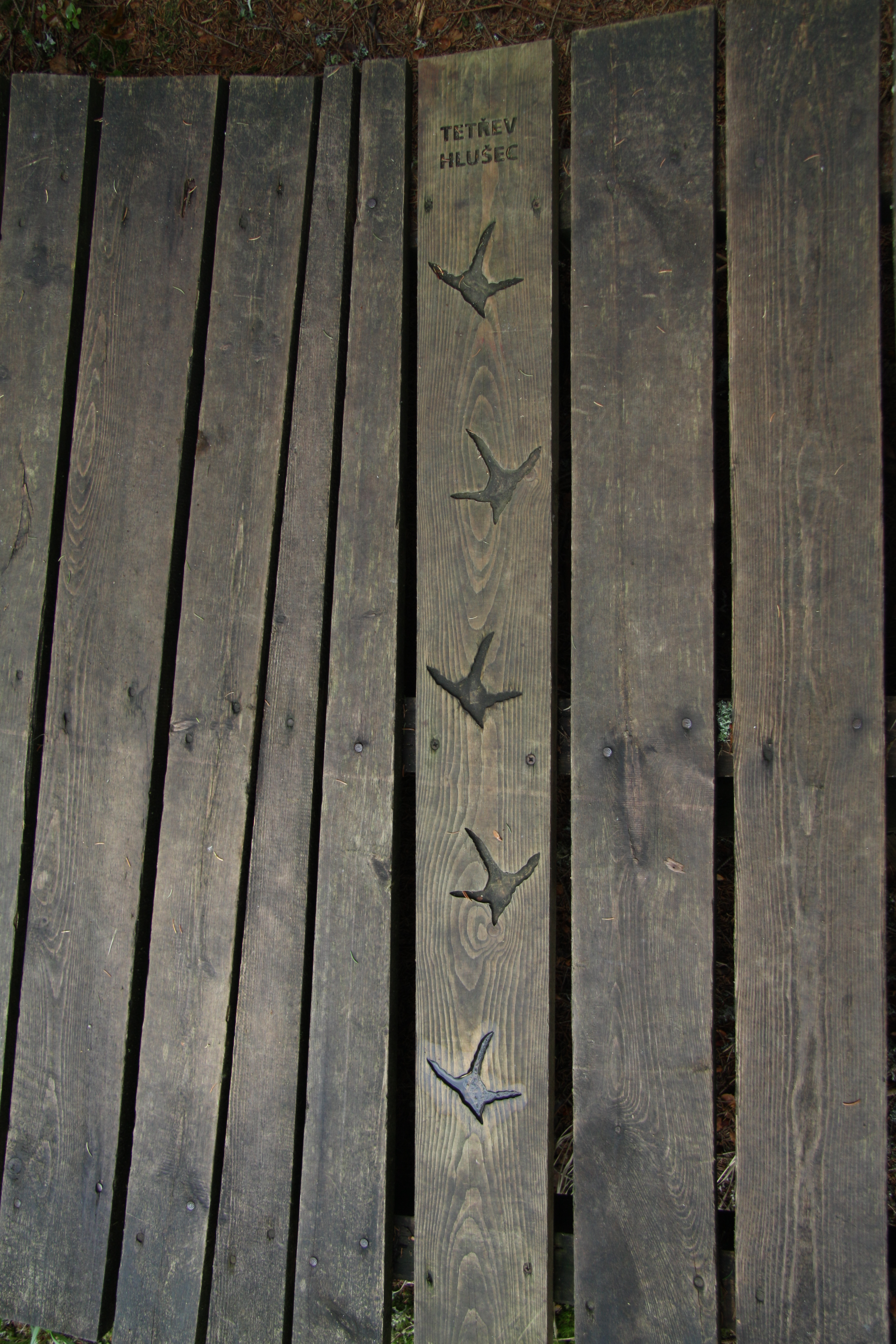
Footprints of western capercaillie in the Czech national nature reserve Kladské rašeliny

This species has an estimated range of 1,000,000–10,000,000 km^{2} (390,000–3,860,000 sq mi) and a population of between 1.5 and 2 million individuals in Europe alone. There is some evidence of a population decline, but the overall species is not believed to approach the IUCN Red List threshold of a population decline of more than 30% in ten years or three generations. It is therefore evaluated as least concern.

As reported by the Spanish researcher Félix Rodríguez de la Fuente in his "Fauna" series, the northwestern Spanish subspecies T. u. cantabricus—an Ice Age remnant—was threatened in the 1960s by commercial gathering of holly fruit-bearing branches for sale as Christmas ornaments—a practice imported from Anglo-Saxon or Germanic countries.

In Scotland, the population has declined greatly since the 1960s because of deer fencing, predation and lack of suitable habitat, surviving only in the Caledonian Pine Forest. In 2015, it was named as the bird most likely to become extinct in the UK. The population has plummeted from a high of 10,000 pairs in the 1960s to 532 in the wild by 2025. In mountainous skiing areas, poorly marked cables for ski-lifts have contributed to mortality. Their effects can be mitigated by proper coloring, sighting and height alterations.

A study published in 2022 by NatureScot scientific advisory committee recommended 'renewed intensive measures' to maintain the population, especially steps to assist in the survival of eggs and chicks. An important measure has been to mow the heather to allow one of their staples, blaeberry, to thrive. Predators like crows, foxes and pine martens are blamed for the decline, as well as the deer fences, and increased human recreation in the territory which can injure adult birds.It was declared as 'extremely vulnerable' and requiring urgent action. Biodiversity Minister for Scotland, Lorna Slater, MSP described capercaillie as 'magnificent birds' and 'iconic' for Scotland and called for 'partnership working' to reverse the decline.

== Behaviour and ecology ==
The western capercaillie is adapted to its original habitats—old coniferous forests with a rich interior structure and dense ground vegetation of Vaccinium species under a light canopy. They mainly feed on Vaccinium species, especially bilberry, find cover in young tree growth, and use the open spaces when flying. As habitat specialists, they hardly use any other forest types.

Western capercaillies are not elegant fliers due to their body weight and short, rounded wings. While taking off they produce a sudden thundering noise that deters predators. Because of their body size and wingspan they avoid young and dense forests when flying. While flying they rest in short gliding phases. Their feathers produce a whistling sound.

Capercaillie with her chicks, recorded in Scotland

Western capercaillie, especially the hens with young chicks, require resources that should occur as parts of a small-scaled patchy mosaic: These are food plants, small insects for the chicks, cover in dense young trees or high ground vegetation, old trees with horizontal branches for sleeping. These criteria are met best in old forest stands with spruce and pine, dense ground vegetation and local tree regrowth on dry slopes in southern to western expositions. These open stands allow flights downslope, and the tree regrowth offers cover.

In the lowlands such forest structures developed over centuries by heavy exploitation, especially by the use of litter and grazing livestock. In the highlands and along the ridges of mountain areas in temperate Europe as well as in the taiga region from Fennoscandia to Siberia, the boreal forests show this open structure due to the harsh climate, offering optimal habitats for capercaillie without human influence. Dense and young forests are avoided as there is neither cover nor food, and flight of these large birds is greatly impaired.

The abundance of western capercaillie depends—as with most species—on habitat quality. It is highest in sun-flooded open, old mixed forests with spruce, pine, fir and some beech with a rich ground cover of Vaccinium species.

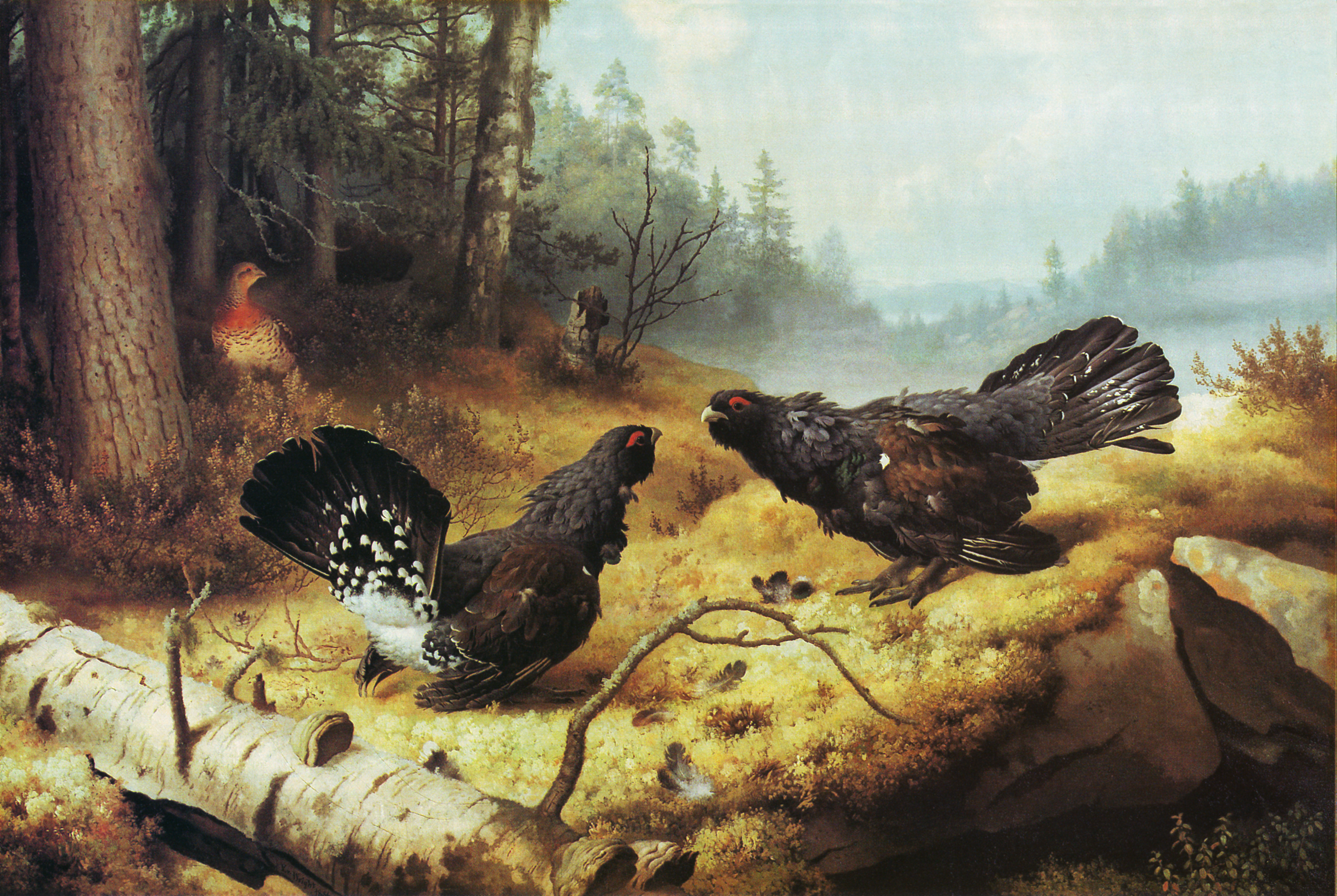
Ferdinand von Wright, The Fighting Capercaillies (Taistelevat metsot), 1886

Spring territories are about 25 hectares (62 acres) per bird. Comparable abundances are found in taiga forests. Thus, the western capercaillie never had particularly high densities, despite the legends that hunters may speculate about. Adult cocks are strongly territorial and occupy a range of 50 to 60 hectares (120 to 150 acres) optimal habitat. Hen territories are about 40 hectares (100 acres). The annual range can be several square kilometres (hundreds of hectares) when storms and heavy snowfall force the birds to winter at lower altitudes. Territories of cocks and hens may overlap.

Western capercaillie are diurnal game, i.e., their activity is limited to the daylight hours. They spend the night in old trees with horizontal branches. These sleeping trees are used for several nights; they can be mapped easily as the ground under them is covered by pellets.

The hens are ground breeders and spend the night on the nest. As long as the young chicks cannot fly, the hen spends the night with them in dense cover on the ground. During winter the hens rarely go down to the ground and most tracks in the snow are from cocks.

== Diet ==
The western capercaillie lives on a variety of food types, including buds, leaves, berries, insects, grasses and in the winter mostly conifer needles. One can see the food remains in their droppings, which are about 1 cm (1/2 in) in diameter and 5–6 cm (2–2 1/2 in) in length. Most of the year the droppings are of solid consistency but, with the ripening of blueberries, these dominate the diet and the faeces become formless and bluish black.

The western capercaillie is a highly specialized herbivore, which feeds almost exclusively on blueberry leaves and berries with some grass seeds and fresh shoots of sedges in summertime. The young chicks are dependent on protein-rich food in their first weeks and thus mainly prey on insects. Available insect supply is strongly influenced by weather—dry and warm conditions allow a fast growth of the chicks, cold and rainy weather leads to high mortality.

During winter, when a high snow cover prevents access to ground vegetation, the western capercaillie spends almost all day and night in trees, feeding on coniferous needles of spruce, pine and fir as well as on buds from beech and rowan.

To digest this coarse winter food, the birds need grit: small stones or gastroliths which they actively search for and devour. With their very muscular stomachs, gizzard stones function like a mill and break needles and buds into small particles. Additionally, western capercaillie have two appendixes which grow very long in winter. With the aid of symbiotic bacteria, the plant material is digested there. During the short winter days the western capercaillie feeds almost constantly and produces a pellet nearly every 10 minutes.

A recent study using DNA from faeces in Norway and France found that their diet is much more varied than had been documented.

== Courting and reproduction ==
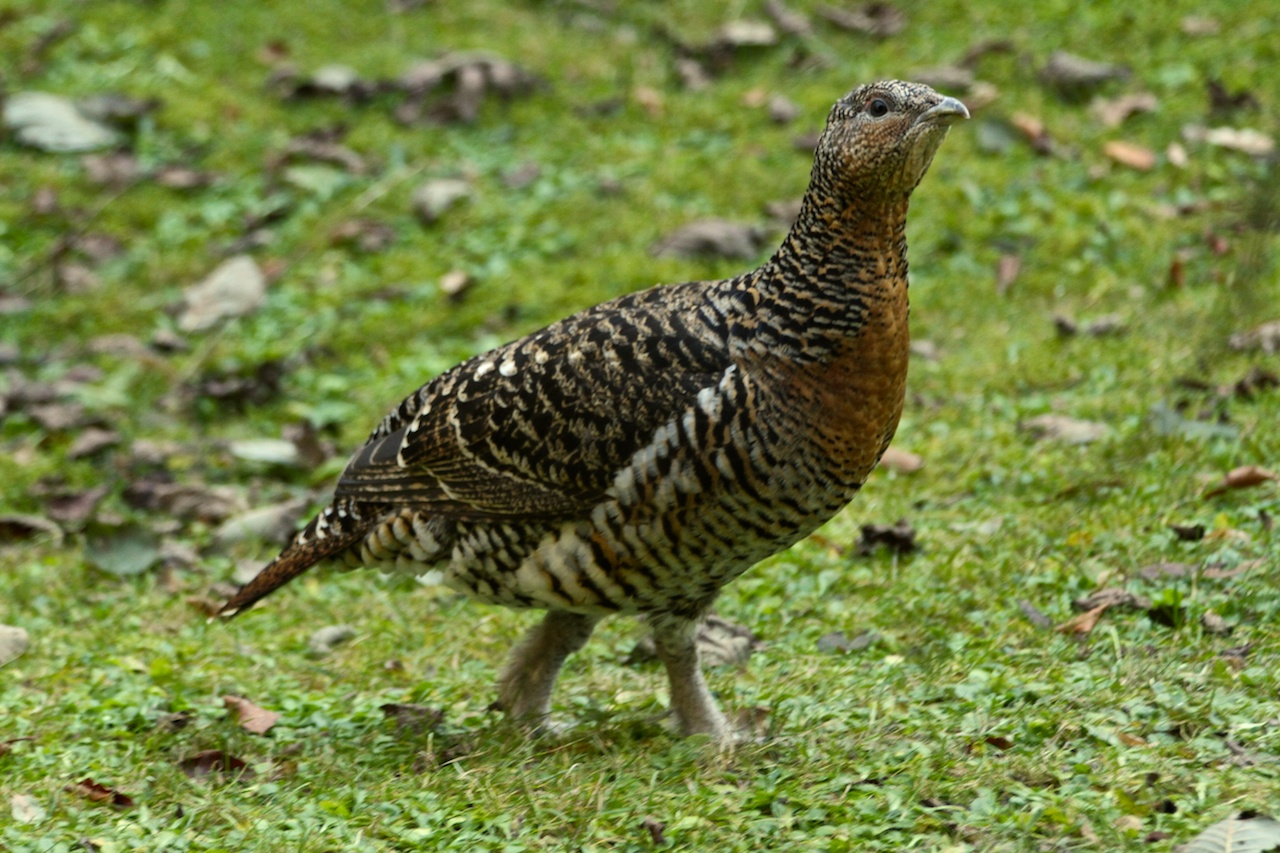
Female in Bavarian Forest, Germany

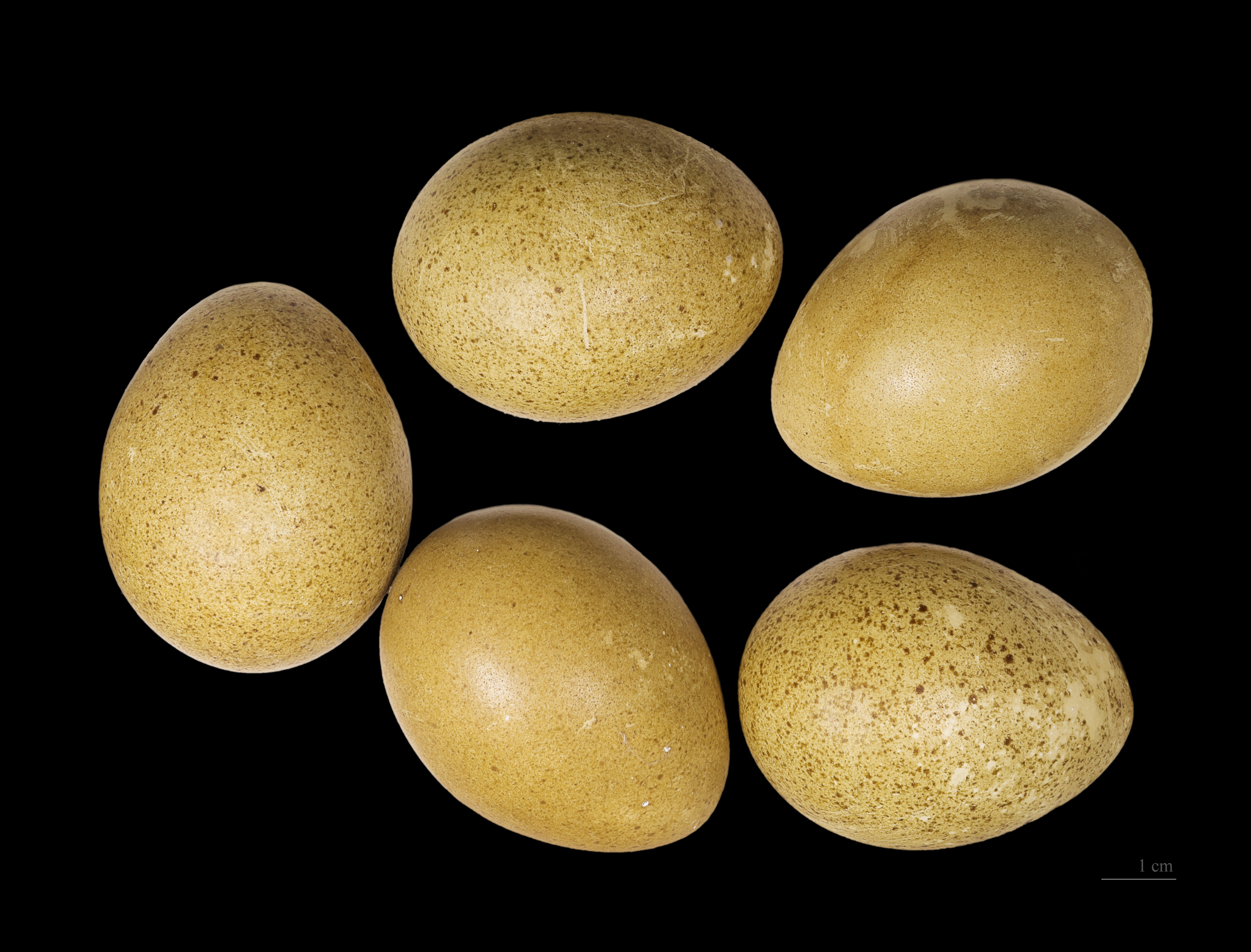
Tetrao urogallus urogallus—eggs

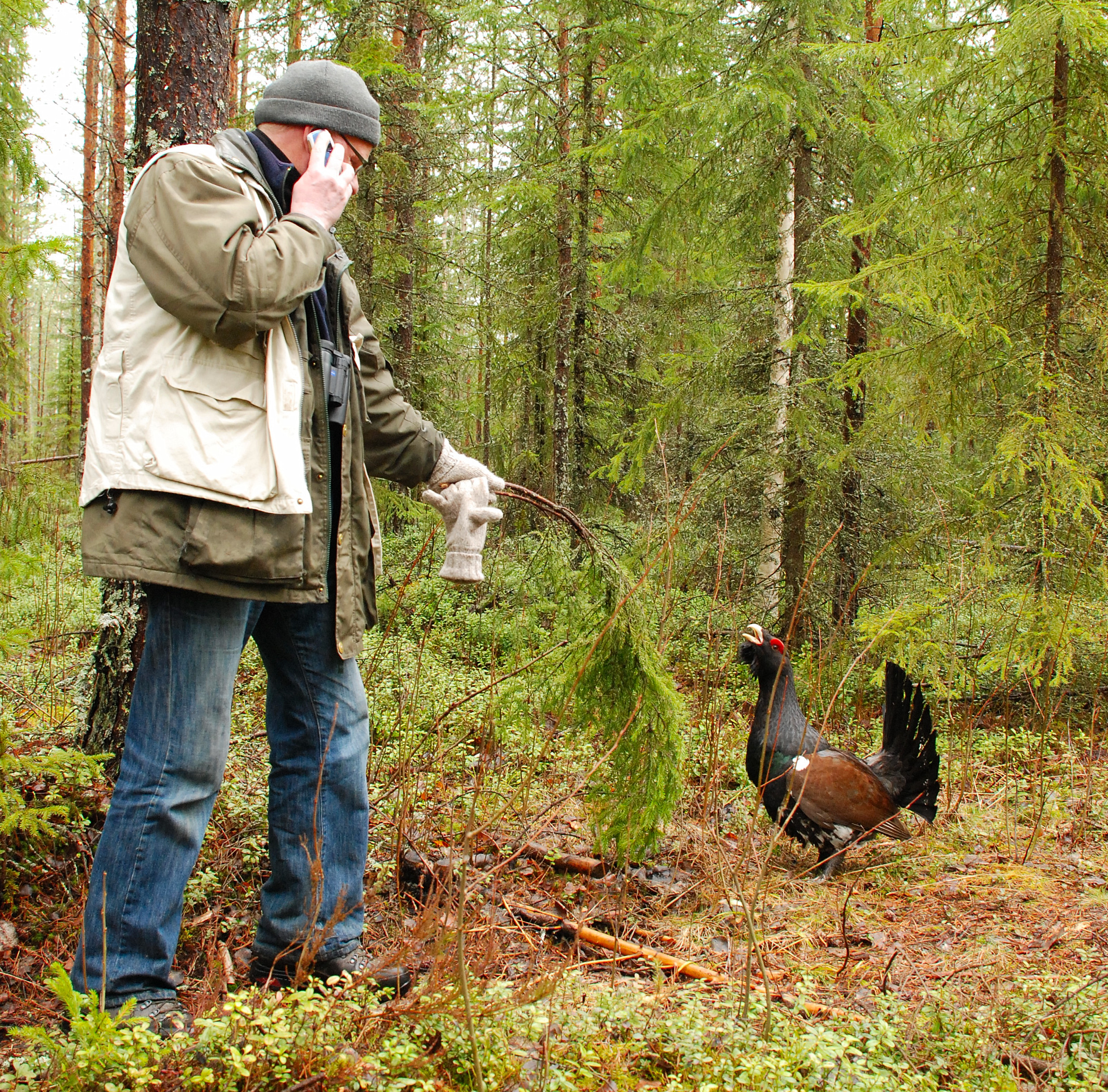
Male capercaillie marking his territory to a hiker in a Finnish taiga forest

The breeding season of the western capercaillie starts according to spring weather progress, vegetation development and altitude between March and April and lasts until May or June. Three-quarters of this long courting season is mere territorial competition between neighbouring cocks or cocks on the same courting ground.

At the very beginning of dawn, the tree courting begins on a thick branch of a lookout tree. The cock postures himself with raised and fanned tail feathers, erect neck, beak pointed skywards, wings held out and drooped and starts his typical aria to impress the females. The typical song in this display is a series of double-clicks like a dropping ping-pong ball, which gradually accelerate into a popping sound like a cork coming off a champagne bottle, which is followed by scraping sounds.

Towards the end of the courting season the hens arrive on the courting grounds, also called "lek", Swedish for "play". The cocks continue courting on the ground: This is the main courting season. The cock flies from his courting tree to an open space nearby and continues his display. The hens, ready to get mounted, crouch and utter a begging sound. If there is more than one cock on the lek, it is mainly the alpha-cock who engages in copulation with the hens. In this phase western capercaillies are most sensitive to disturbances. Even single human observers may cause the hens to fly off and prevent copulation in this very short time span where they are ready for conception.

In Scandinavia and in Scotland, male western capercaillies are well-known for their combative behavior during mating season, sometimes even challenging and chasing off people who enter their territory. In a study it was found that the testosterone level in such "deviant" males was about five times higher than that of normal displaying males.

There is a smaller courting peak in autumn, which serves to delineate the territories for the winter months and the next season.

=== Egg-laying ===
About three days after copulation the hen starts laying eggs. In 10 days the clutch is full. The average clutch size is eight eggs but may amount up to 12, rarely only four or five eggs. Brooding lasts about 26–28 days according to weather and altitude.

At the beginning of the brooding season, the hens are very sensitive to disturbances and leave the nest quickly. Towards the end they tolerate disturbances to a certain degree, crouching on their nest which is usually hidden under low branches of a young tree or a broken tree crown. As hatching nears, hens sit tighter on the nest and will only flush from the nest if disturbed in very close proximity. Nesting hens rarely spend more than an hour a day off of the nest feeding and as such become somewhat constipated. The presence of a nest nearby is often indicated by distinctively enlarged and malformed droppings known as "clocker droppings". All eggs hatch in close proximity after which the hen and clutch abandon the nest where they are at their most vulnerable. Abandoned nests often contain "caeacal" droppings; the discharge from the hens' appendixes built up over the incubation period.

=== Hatching and growth ===
After hatching the chicks are dependent on getting warmed by the hen. Like all precocial birds, the young are fully covered by down feathers at hatching but are not able to maintain their body temperature which is 41 °C (106 °F) in birds. In cold and rainy weather the chicks need to get warmed by the hen every few minutes and all night.

They seek food independently and prey mainly on insects, like butterfly caterpillars and pupae, ants, myriapodae, ground beetles.

They grow rapidly and most of the energy intake is transformed into the protein of the flight musculature (the white flesh around the breast in chickens). At an age of 3–4 weeks they are able to perform their first short flights. From this time on they start to sleep in trees on warm nights. At an age of about 6 weeks they are fully able to maintain their body temperature. The down feathers have been moulted into the immature plumage and at an age of 3 months another moult brings in their subadult plumage; now the two sexes can be easily distinguished.

From the beginning of September the families start to dissolve. First the young cocks disperse, then the young hens. Both sexes may form loose foraging groups over the winter.

== Predation and hunting ==
Mammalian predators known to take capercaillie include Eurasian lynx (Lynx lynx) and gray wolf (Canis lupus), although they prefer slightly larger prey. Meanwhile, European pine martens (Martes martes), beech martens (Martes foina), brown bears (Ursus arctos), wild boars (Sus scrofa) and red foxes (Vulpes vulpes) take mostly eggs and chicks but can attack adults if they manage to ambush the often wary birds. In Sweden, western capercaillies are the primary prey of the golden eagle (Aquila chrysaetos). Large numbers are taken by Eurasian goshawks (Astur gentilis), including adults but usually young ones, and Eurasian eagle-owls (Bubo bubo) will occasionally pick off a capercaillie of any age or size; they normally prefer mammalian foods. White-tailed eagles (Haliaeetus albicilla) are more likely to take water birds than upland-type birds but have been recorded preying on capercaillie around the White Sea.

A traditional gamebird, the capercaillie has been widely hunted with guns and dogs throughout its territory in central and northern Europe. This includes trophy hunting and hunting for food. Since hunting has been restricted in many countries, trophy-hunting has become a tourist resource, particularly in central European countries. In some areas, declines are due to excessive hunting, though this has not generally been a global problem. The bird has not been hunted in Scotland or Germany for over 30 years.
