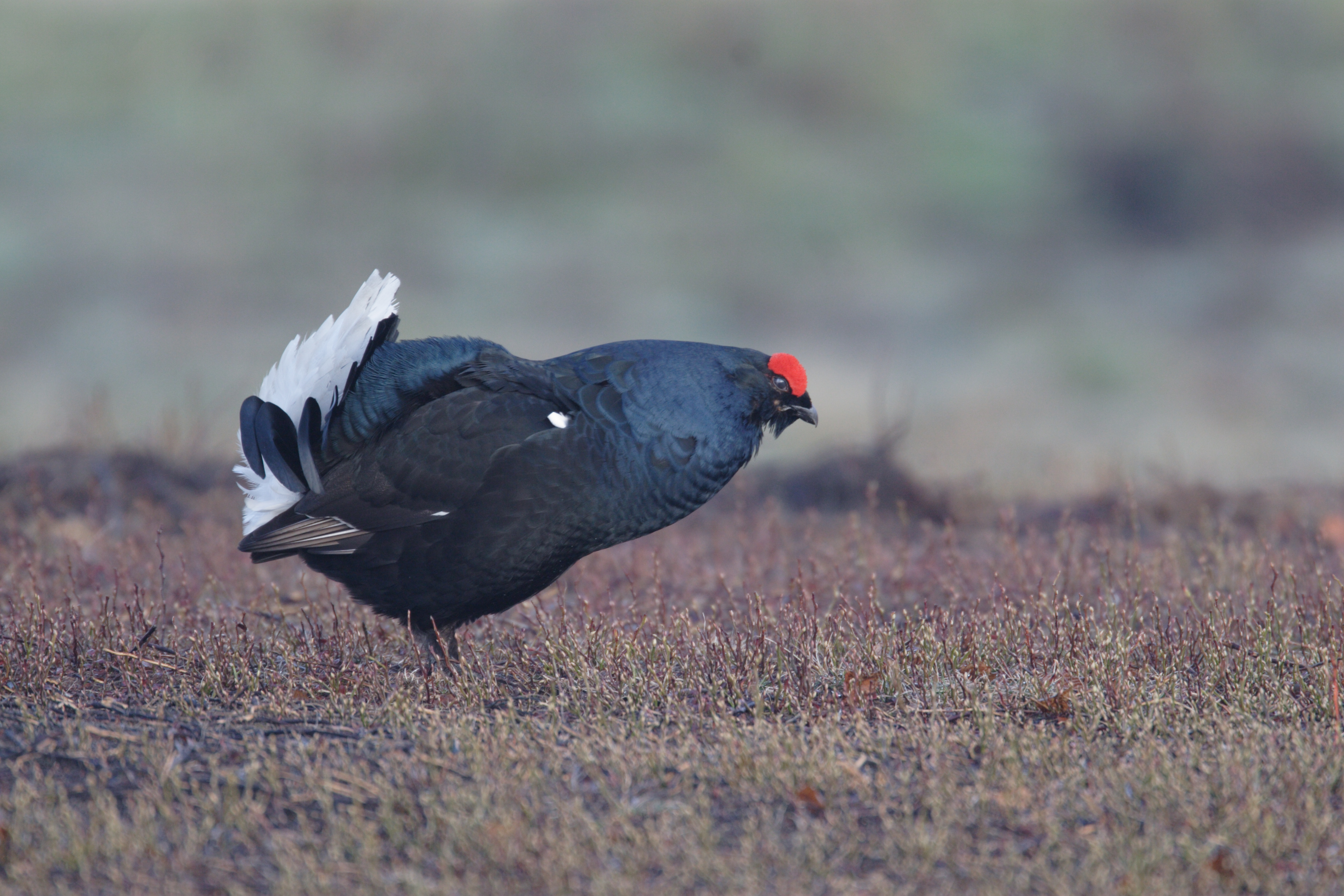
- Black grouse (Lyrurus tetrix)

Scientific classification
- Kingdom: Animalia
- Phylum: Chordata
- Class: Aves
- Order: Galliformes
- Family: Phasianidae
- Tribe: Tetraonini
- Genus: Lyrurus; Swainson, 1832

Type species
- Tetrao tetrix (black grouse) Linnaeus, 1758

Species
- Lyrurus tetrix Lyrurus mlokosiewiczi

= Lyrurus =

Lyrurus Temporal range: Early Pliocene to recent

Genus of birds

Lyrurus is a genus of birds in the grouse subfamily. They are known as black grouse because the male's plumage of both species is colored black as its base colour.

== Taxonomy ==
The genus Lyrurus was introduced in 1832 by the English naturalist William Swainson with the black grouse as the type species. The genus name combines the Ancient Greek lura meaning "lyre" with -ouros meaning "-tailed".

=== Species ===
The genus contains two species:

Genus Lyrurus – Swainson, 1832 – two species
Common name	Scientific name and subspecies	Range	Size and ecology	IUCN status and estimated population
Black grouse	Lyrurus tetrix (Linnaeus, 1758) Six subspecies: L. t. baikalensis (Lorenz T., 1911); L. t. britannicus (Witherby & Lönnberg, 1913); L. t. mongolicus (Lönnberg, 1904); L. t. tetrix (Linnaeus, 1758); L. t. ussuriensis (Kohts, 1911); L. t. viridanus (Lorenz T., 1891)	Europe (Swiss-Italian-French Alps specially) from Great Britain (but not Ireland) through Scandinavia and Estonia, eastwards through Russia and parts of Kazakhstan, Mongolia, and China	Size: Habitat: Diet:	LC
Caucasian grouse	Lyrurus mlokosiewiczi (Taczanowski, 1875)	The Caucasus, specifically the Caucasus Mountains	Size: Habitat: Diet:	LC
