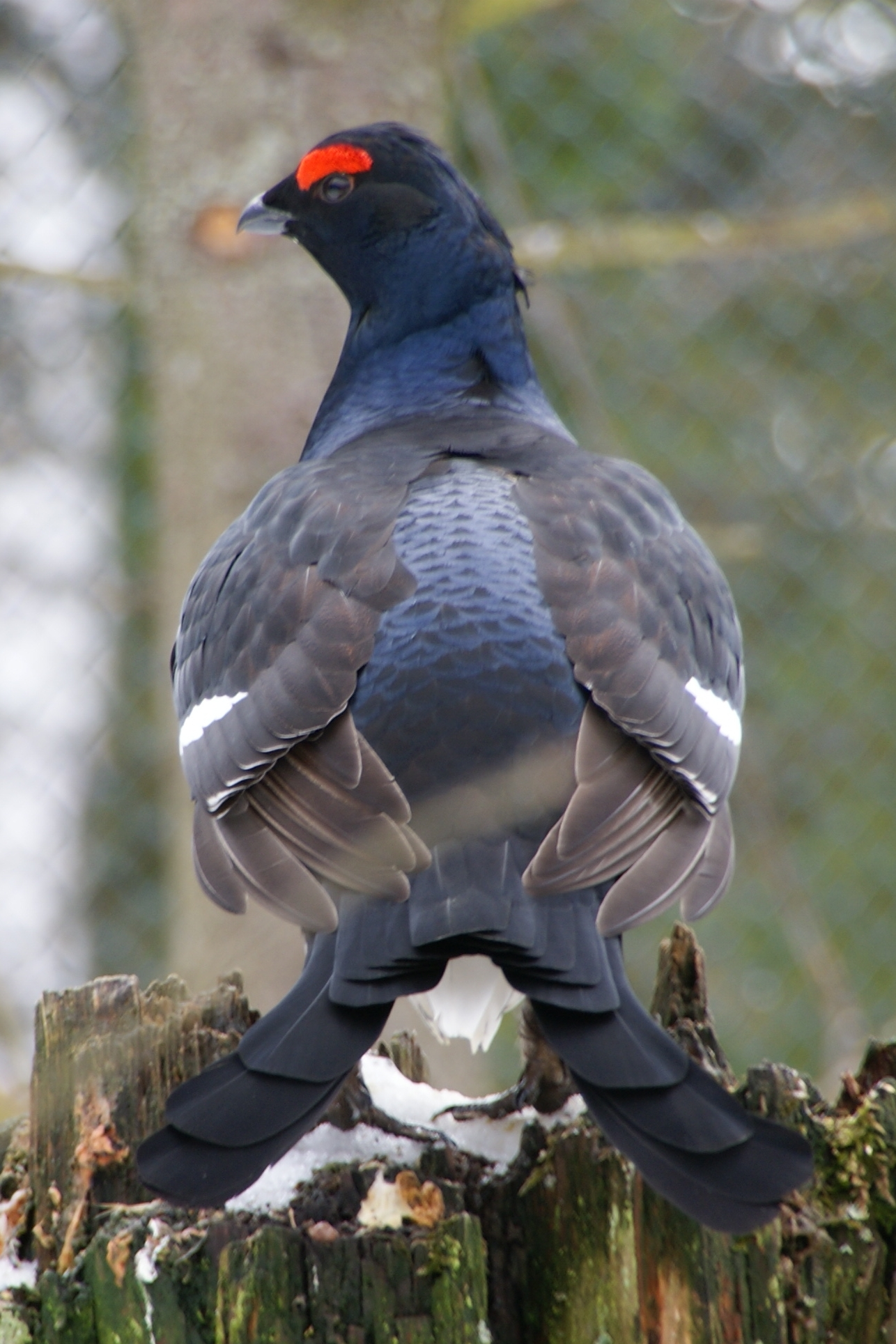
- Male Bird recorded in Fife, Scotland

Conservation status
- Least Concern (IUCN 3.1)

Scientific classification
- Kingdom: Animalia
- Phylum: Chordata
- Class: Aves
- Order: Galliformes
- Family: Phasianidae
- Genus: Lyrurus
- Species: L. tetrix

Binomial name
- Lyrurus tetrix (Linnaeus, 1758)
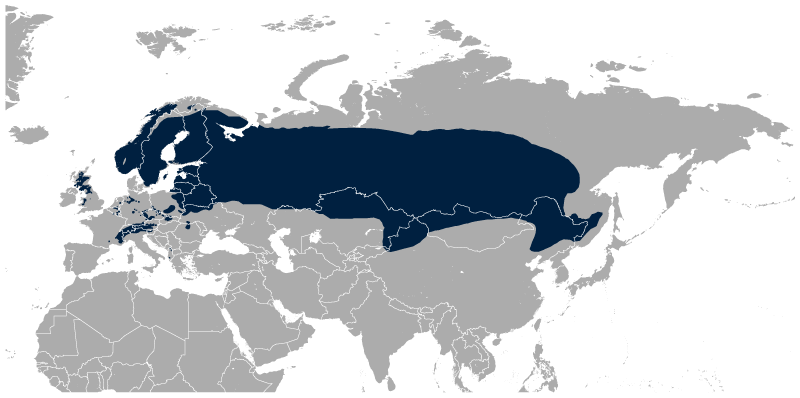
- Black grouse range
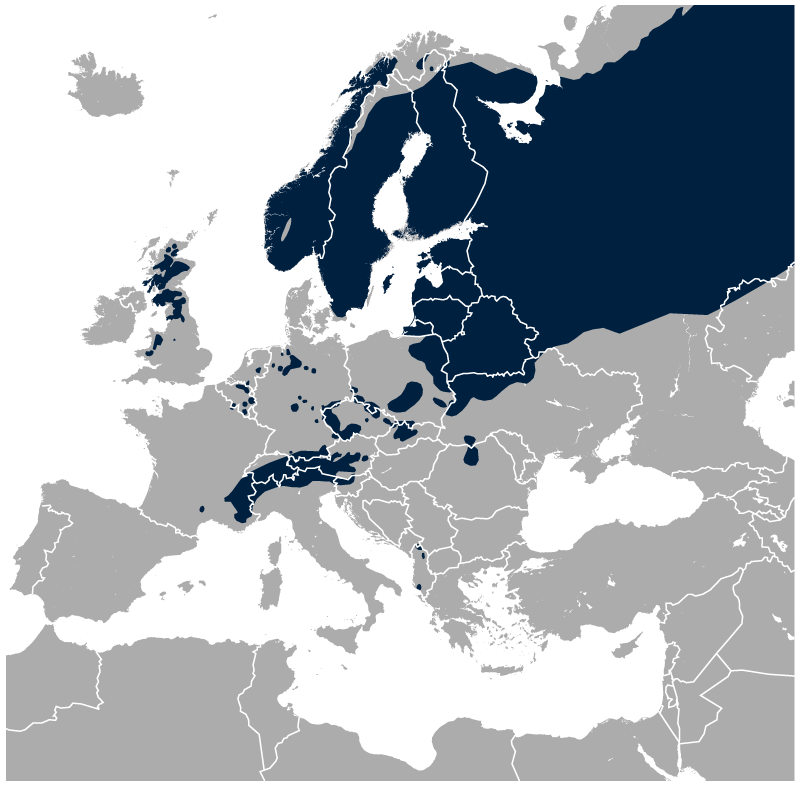
- Distribution in Europe.

Synonyms
- Tetrao tetrix

= Black grouse =

Species of bird

The black grouse (Lyrurus tetrix), also known as northern black grouse, Eurasian black grouse, blackgame or blackcock, is a large bird in the grouse tribe. It is a sedentary species, spanning across the Palearctic in moorland and steppe habitat when breeding, often near wooded areas. They will spend the winter perched in dense forests, feeding almost exclusively on the needles of conifers. The black grouse is one of two species of grouse in the genus Lyrurus, the other being the lesser-known Caucasian grouse.

The female is greyish-brown and has a cackling or warbling call. She takes all responsibility for nesting and caring for the chicks, as typical with most galliforms.

The black grouse's genome was sequenced in 2014.

== Taxonomy and naming ==
The black grouse was formally described by the Swedish naturalist Carl Linnaeus in 1758 in the tenth edition of his Systema Naturae under the binomial name Tetrao tetrix. Both Tetrao and tetrix come from Ancient Greek words referring to some form of game bird. The black grouse is now placed in the genus Lyrurus that was introduced in 1832 by the English naturalist William Swainson.

The male and female are sometimes referred to by their folk names, blackcock and greyhen, respectively. These names first occur in the literature with John Ray in 1674. Heathcock and Heathhen are also common names.

=== Subspecies ===
The black grouse has six recognized subspecies. Black grouse populations differ slightly in size and coloration, with birds increasing in size further east of their range:

- L. t. baikalensis (Lorenz T., 1911) – southeastern Siberia to northern Mongolia and northwestern Manchuria (China)
- L. t. britannicus (Witherby & Lönnberg, 1913) – Scotland, Wales and northern England
- L. t. mongolicus (Lönnberg, 1904) – eastern Kyrgyzstan and northwestern China towards eastern Kazakhstan, south-central Siberia and western Mongolia
- L. t. tetrix (Linnaeus, 1758) – Scandinavia to southern France and northern Italy and northeastern Siberia
- L. t. ussuriensis (Kohts, 1911) – eastern Siberia and northeastern China including northwest Korea.
- L. t. viridanus (Lorenz T., 1891) – southeastern Russia to southwestern Siberia

== Description and appearance ==
The black grouse is a large bird with males measuring roughly around 60 centimetres (24 inches) in length and weighing 1,100–1,250 g (2 lb 7 oz – 2 lb 12 oz), sometimes up to 2,100 g (4 lb 10 oz), with females approximately 45 cm (18 in) and weighing 750–1,100 g (1 lb 10 oz – 2 lb 7 oz). The cock's fancy plumage is predominantly black with deep-blue hues on his neck and back, which contrasts the white wingline and undertail coverts, as well as red bare skin above each eye. On the other hand, the hen is much drabber and cryptically colored to blend in easily with the dense undergrowth, especially when nesting. The black grouse, along with the Caucasian grouse, has long outer rectrices (tail feathers) that curl outward and arranged in a way it resembles the frame of a Greek lyre, hence the genus name, Lyrurus.

Black grouse cock displaying

== Distribution and habitat ==
Black grouse can be found on open habitats across Europe (Swiss-Italian-French Alps especially) from Great Britain through Scandinavia, Estonia and across Russia. Although believed once to have lived in Ireland, it now no longer resides there. In Eastern Europe they can be found in Hungary, Latvia, Lithuania, Poland, Belarus, Romania and Ukraine. There is a population in the Alps, and isolated remnants in Germany, France, Belgium and the Netherlands. It formerly occurred in Denmark, but the Danish Ornithological Society (DOF) has considered it extinct since 2001. The species disappeared from Bulgaria in the 19th century. In Asia, a huge portion of their population can be found in Russia (particularly southern Siberia), though they also inhabit parts of Kazakhstan, Mongolia, China, and possibly Korea.

Black grouse are adapted to an extensive array of habitats across Eurasia, though most frequently utilize the transitionary zones between forests and open clearings, especially steppe, heathland, grassland and pasture when near agricultural fields. Depending on the season, they will overwinter in large flocks in dense forests, and feed primarily on the leaves and buds of coniferous and broadleaf trees, such as Scots pine, Siberian larch, silver birch, and Eurasian aspen. Throughout the spring and summer, they tend to favor open spaces to seek potential mates and raise broods, switching their diet to berries, shoots and stems of cranberries, bog bilberries, myrtleberries, and other Vaccinium shrubs. They avoid the most extreme of desert and polar regions.

== Conservation status ==
Although this species has declined throughout most of its range in western Europe, it is not considered to be vulnerable globally due to the large population (global estimate is 15–40 million individuals) and slow rate of decline. Its decline is due to loss of habitat, disturbance, predation by foxes, crows, etc., and small populations gradually dying out.

The IUCN implemented a Black Grouse Action Plan 2007–2010. This has looked at local populations that are vulnerable to the extinction vortex. For example, in Styria, Austria.

In the United Kingdom black grouse are found in upland areas of north Wales, the Pennines and most of Scotland. Best looked for on farmland and moorland with nearby forestry or scattered trees. They have traditional lek sites where the males display.

They have declined in some parts of the UK (especially England), having disappeared from many of their former haunts. They are now extirpated in Lancashire, Derbyshire, Exmoor, East Yorkshire, New Forest, Nottinghamshire, Worcestershire, Quantock Hills, Cornwall, Dartmoor, Kent, Wiltshire and Surrey.

A programme to re-introduce black grouse into the wild started in 2003 in the Upper Derwent Valley area of the Peak District in England. Thirty grouse were released in October 2003, followed by ten male grouse in December 2004 and a further ten males and ten females in April 2005. The programme is being run jointly by the National Trust, Severn Trent Water and Peak District National Park.

Conservation groups helping to revive the black grouse include the RSPB and the Game & Wildlife Conservation Trust.

In France there has been much work regarding the birds and their risk of flying into ski-lifts.

From 1950 to 2000, local black grouse populations have steadily diminished in Manchuria and northeastern China by about 39%, with birds being most affected (and possibly extirpated) in the Jilin Province. Though the exact causes for local declines remain largely unclear, habitat loss and excess hunting have played a part in the overall reduction. Shifts in their location, however can happen concurrently with the depletion over decades, so short-term research projects may not provide much proof of driving forces behind population alterations.

Based on historical info gathered from various sources (including wildlife surveys and scientific papers), aspen, birch, and poplar make up the black grouse's staple diet and habitat. The climate and precipitation during the month of June is also linked to the breeding success of black grouse.

== Breeding and nesting ==
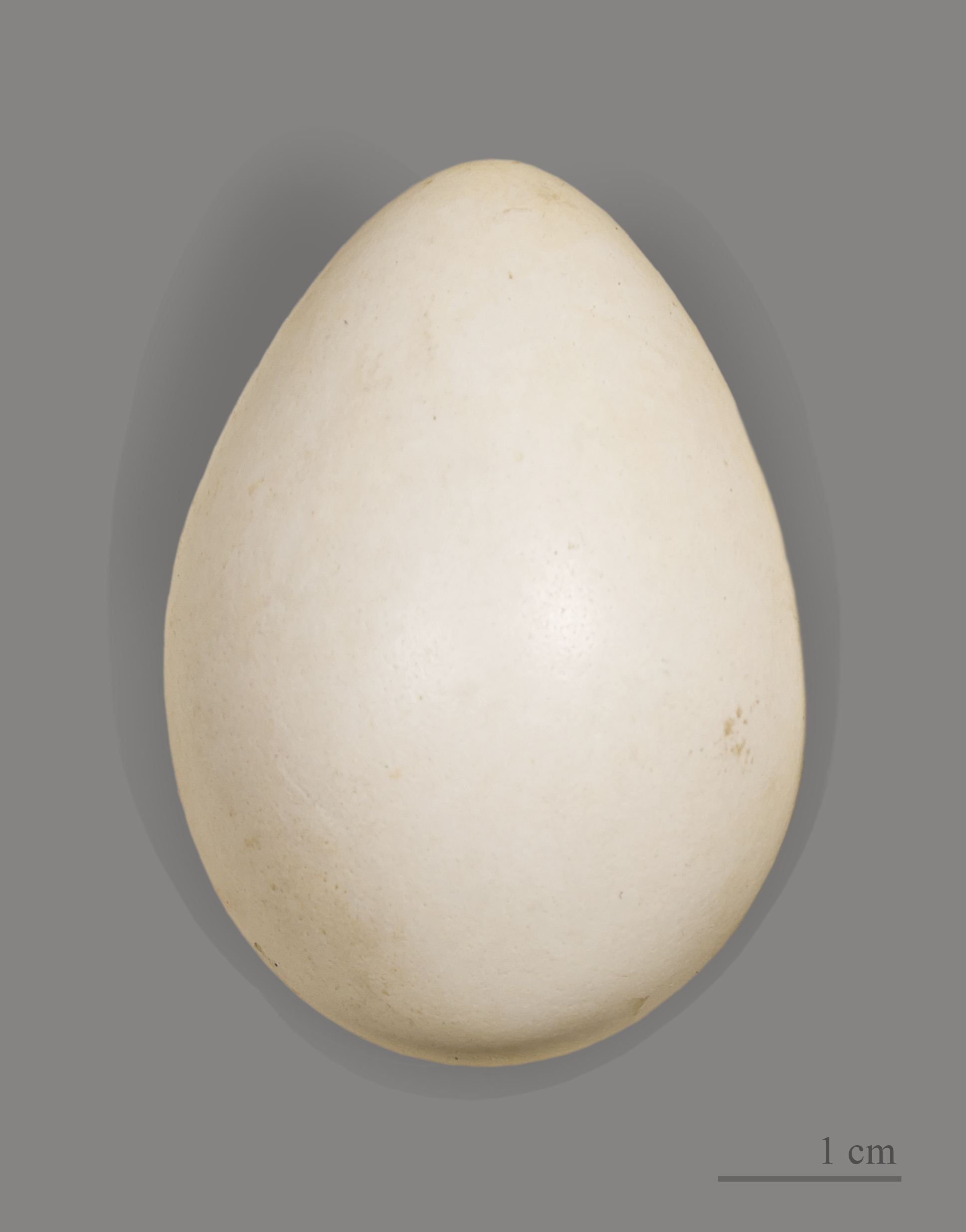
Egg of Tetrao tetrix tetrix – MHNT

Black grouse – rolling and hissing sounds, recorded in 2022 in the northern Alps

Black grouse – recorded in 2022 in the northern Alps. Mostly rolling sounds audible.

Black grouse have a very distinctive and well-recorded courtship ritual. Every dawn in the spring, male grouse begin competition with other males to attract a hen to mate with. They will display to signal their territory and vigor by fanning out their lyre-shaped tails and inflating their necks on designated open ground called a lek. Their song consists of a long, bubbling coo or murmur. Black grouse hens visiting the lek decide the overall healthiest male, though not all females may arrive at every lek.

In western Europe, these leks seldom contain more than 40 birds; in Russia, 150 is not uncommon and up to 200 have been recorded.

When mated successfully, she will fly away from the site to a suitable nesting site with an abundance of dense shrub or tall vegetation, often located at a tree base in between roots, under low branches, beside a boulder, or extremely rarely, a used raptor's or corvid's nest 7 metres (23 ft) off the ground. A dent (23–28 cm or 9–11 in wide by 10–11 cm or 4–4 1/2 in deep) is scraped out on the dirt floor and cushioned with grasses, sticks, leaves, and feathers. About 6–11 pale buff eggs speckled brown are then laid in the nest, incubated for approx. 23–28 days. The chicks consume invertebrates, transitioning to more plant matter as they mature. By around 10–14 days and so forth, they are capable of short flights.

Where their range overlaps in similar biomes of other species, they are capable of hybridizing with the ringneck pheasant, western capercaillie, black-billed capercaillie, Siberian grouse, hazel grouse, and willow ptarmigan.

== Relationship to humans ==
The black grouse in the coat of arms of Tuusniemi

The tails of black-cocks have, since late Victorian times, been popular adornments for hats worn with Highland Dress. Most commonly associated with Glengarry and Balmoral or Tam o' Shanter caps, they still continue to be worn by pipers of civilian and military pipe bands. Since 1904, all ranks of the Royal Scots and King's Own Scottish Borderers have worn them in their full-dress headgear and that tradition is carried on in the dress glengarries of the current Scottish super regiment, the Royal Regiment of Scotland.

== Gallery ==
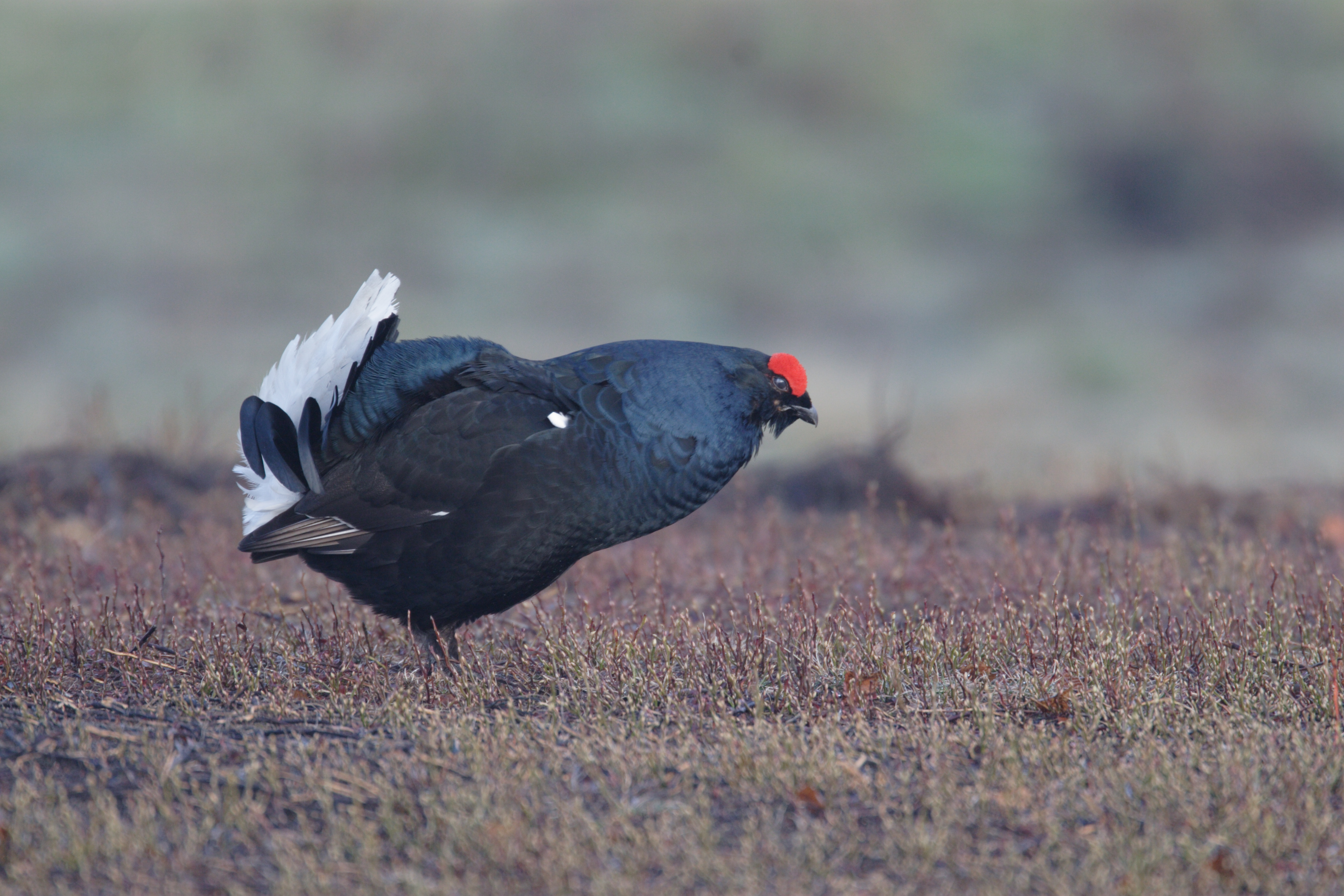
Male displaying

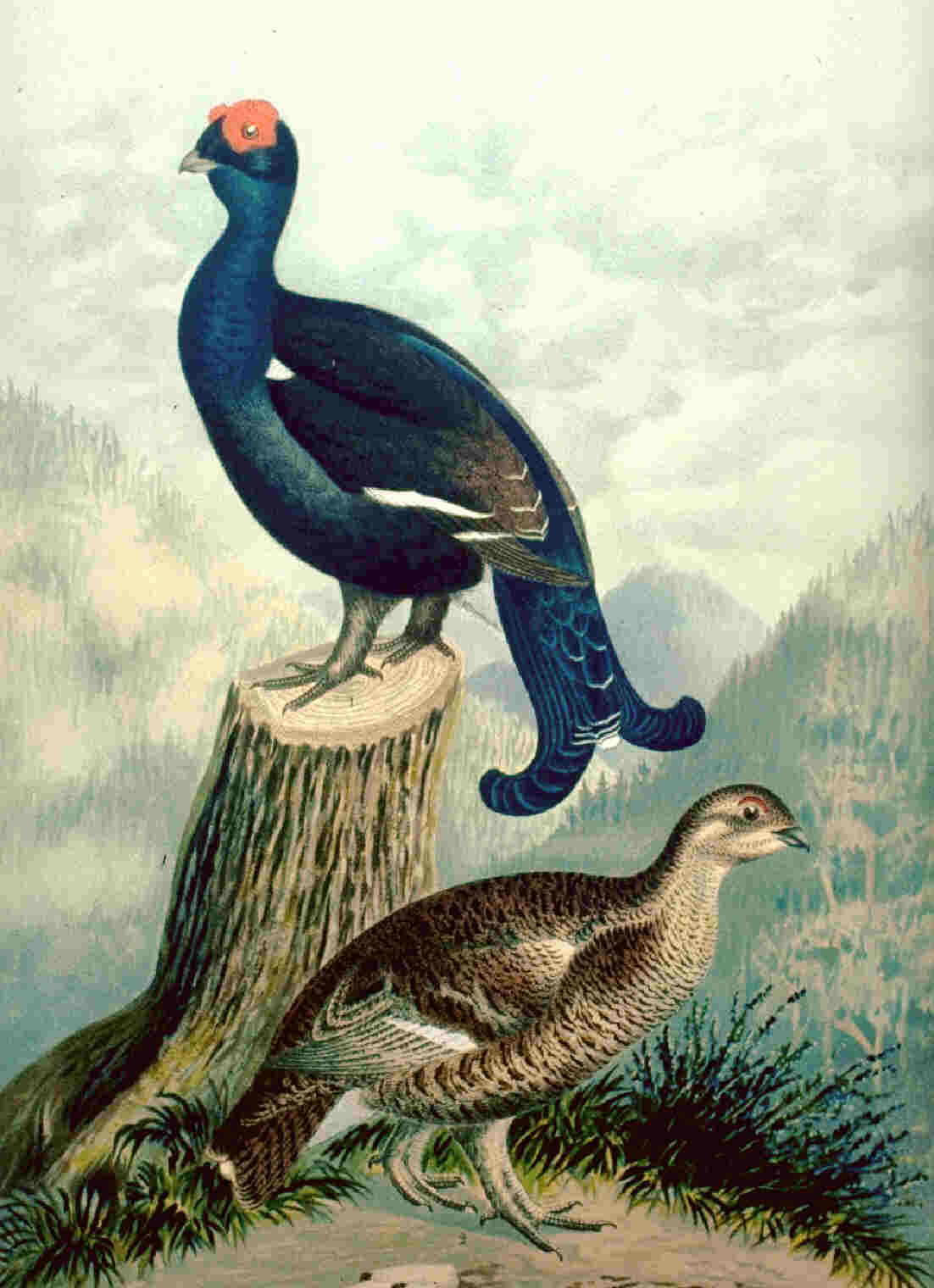
Painting of a male and female

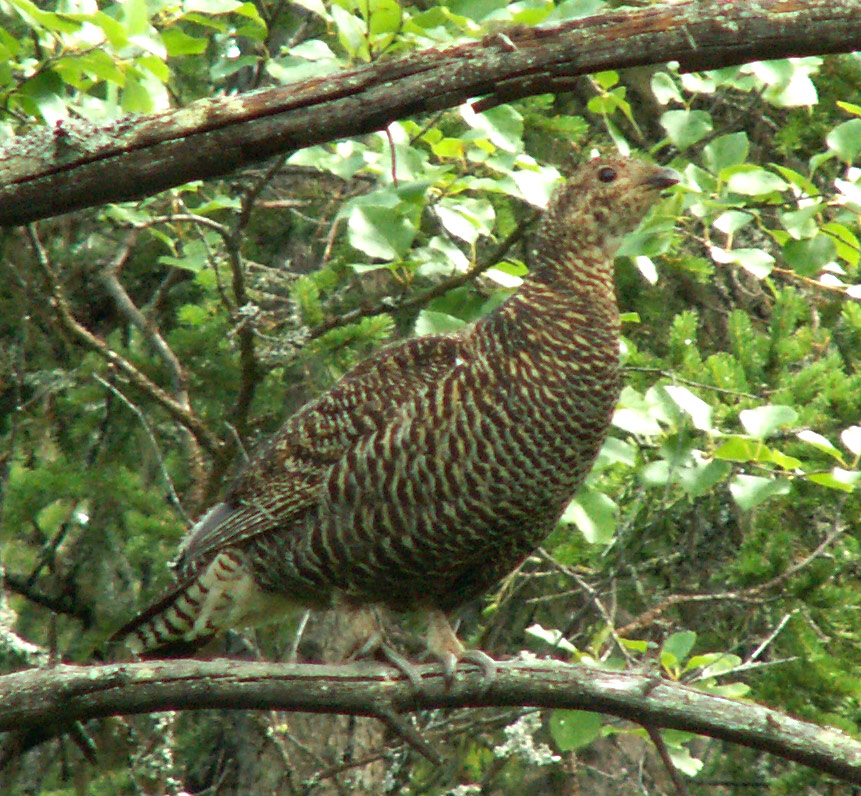
Female

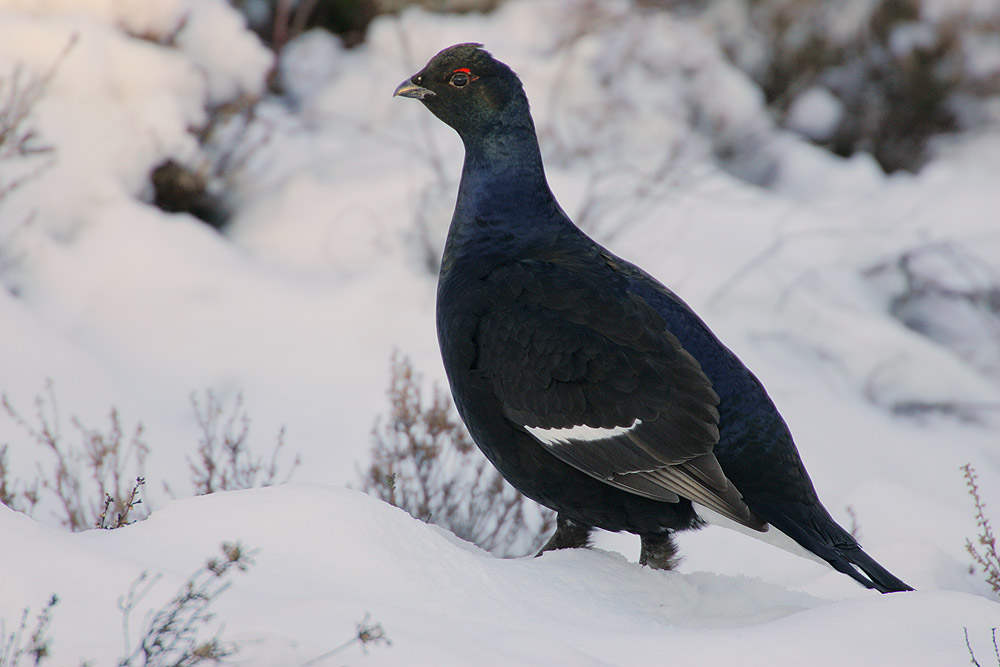
On snow

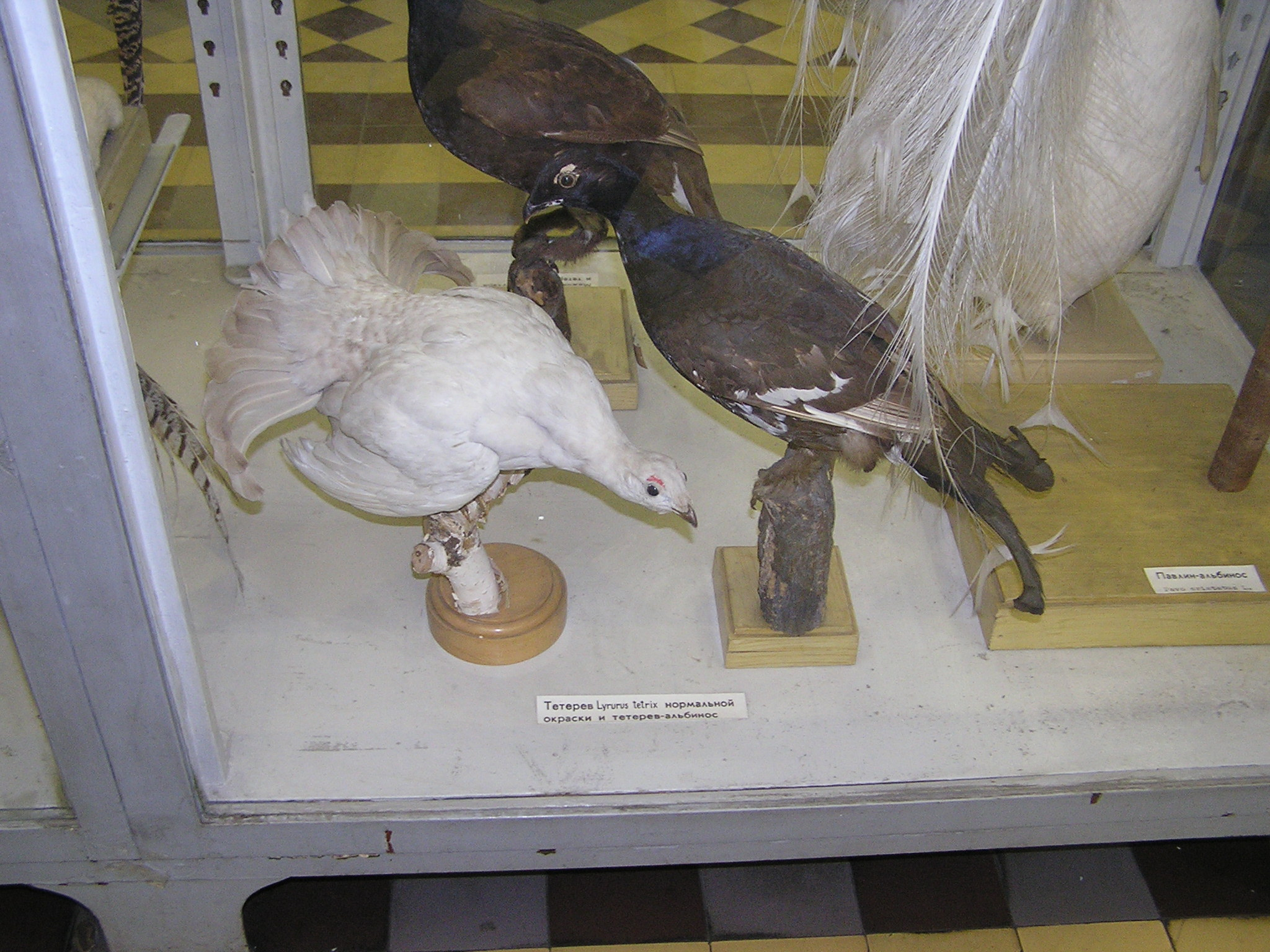
Taxidermies with different color anomalies
