= Sergey Snigirewski =

Sergey Ivanovich Snigirewski (Russian: Сергей Иванович Снигиревский; 10 January 1896 [29 December 1895] – 24 November 1955) was a Russian and Soviet ornithologist who was interested in the management of game birds for hunting, zoogeography, and ecology. He was a student of Pyotr Petrovich Sushkin and was a founder of the Bashkir hunters commission.

Sergey was born in Tula to Ivan Alekseevich and Sofya Alekseevna but his parents divorced when he was young and he grew up with his mother and stepfather Vladimir Dmitrievich Shidlovsky, an insurance agent at Tula Zemstvo who was also a friend of the ornithologist Nikolai Zarudny. He studied at the Tula classical gymnasium from 1905 to 1915, and influenced by a teacher G.O. Claire, studying insects at the Tula Entomological Station in 1911 under A. A. Sopotsko, while also publishing his first research. He then went to Moscow to study biology where he was influenced by M.A. Menzbir, T.I. Polyakov and S.S. Nenyukov. In 1916 he joined the 59th infantry regiment in Voronezh and then in the 48th Siberian Regiment and was demobilized in 1918 and in the same year lost his mother, stepfather and a brother to typhus. He served in the Red Army between 1919 and 1920. He worked at the Askania Nova research station from 1920 to 1923. Sushkin who headed ornithology at Petrograd in 1921, invited Snigirewski to handle the collections of birds from Askania-Nova so he returned to Leningrad University and graduated in 1925. He worked for a while in the Zoological Museum and at Leningrad Zoo. In 1926 he visited the South Urals and worked at the Ilmensky reserve. In 1928 he was part of the Baskhir expedition and explored the lakes of Kazakhstan. He joined several expeditions including the Dzungarian Alatau (1933–34). He returned to Leningrad to work for a while and spent time on the management of the Bashkir and Kuibyshev reserves. After the war he worked in the Arctic Institute examining the collections from the far east and taught at the University of Leningrad.

Snigirewski married ecologist Ekaterina Mikhailovna Snigirevskaya and they had two daughters Natalia (1932-2015) and Ekaterina (1939) who also became scientists (Natalia - paleobotanist, Ekaterina - cytologist). He died in Leningrad. A subspecies of lesser whitethroat, Sylvia curruca snigirewskii was described by Stachanow in 1929.
