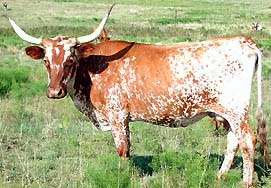

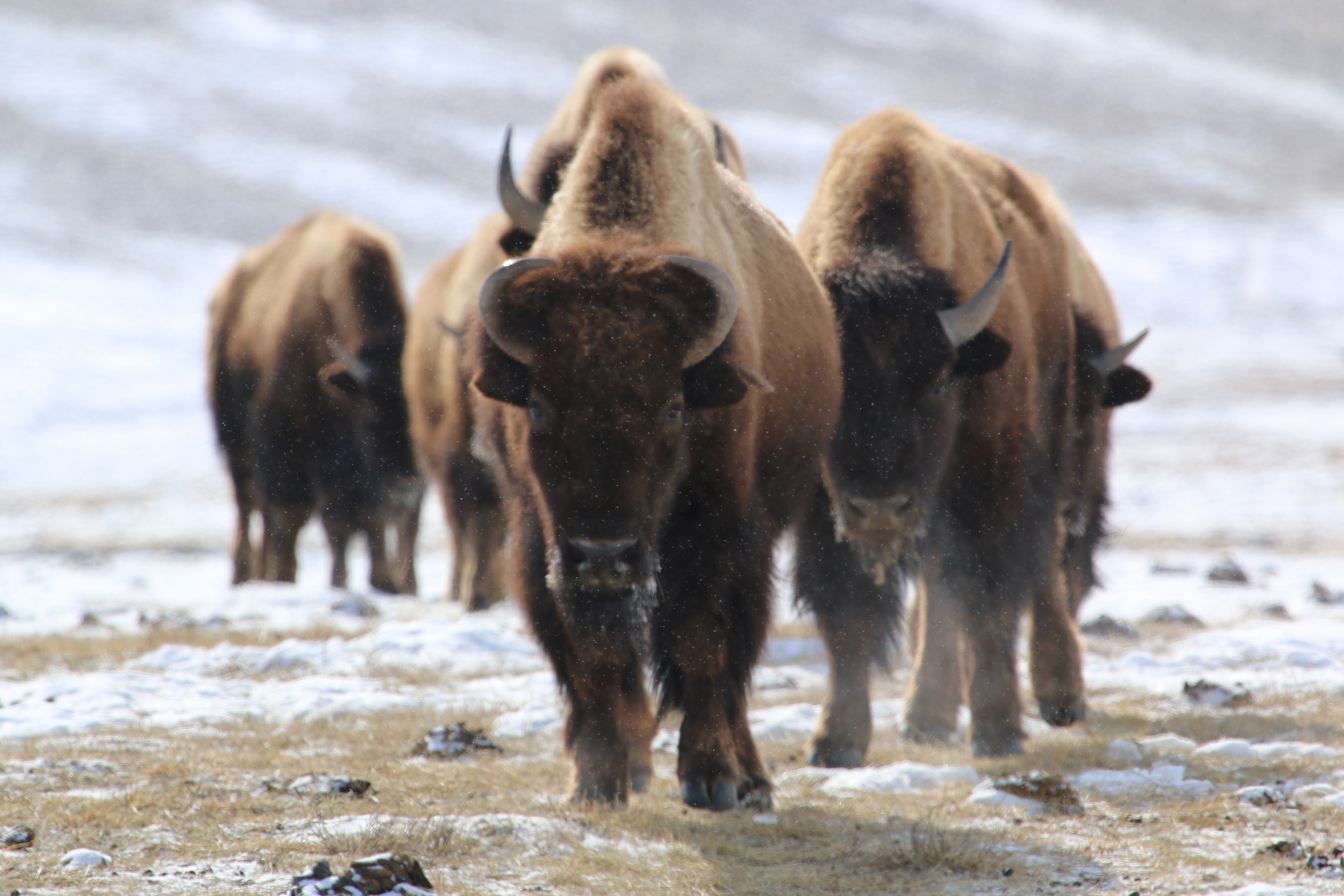
- Texas Longhorn cattle (Bos taurus; top image) and a herd of American bison (Bison bison; bottom)

Scientific classification
- Kingdom: Animalia
- Phylum: Chordata
- Class: Mammalia
- Order: Artiodactyla
- Family: Bovidae
- Subfamily: Bovinae
- Tribe: Bovini
- Subtribe: Bovina; Gray, 1821

Type genus
- Bos Linnaeus, 1758

Genera
- †Adjiderebos (Dubrovo & Burchak-Abramovich, 1984); Bison Hamilton-Smith, 1827 (nested within Bos); Bos Linnaeus, 1758 (paraphyletic); †Epileptobos (Hooijer, 1956); †Ioribos (Vekua, 1972); †Leptobos Rütimeyer, 1878; †Pelorovis Reck, 1928; †Platycerabos (Barbour & Schultz, 1942); †Protobison (Burchak-Abramovich, Gadzhiev & Vekua, 1980); †Urmiabos (Burchak-Abramovich, 1950); †Yakopsis (Kretzoi, 1954)

Synonyms
- Bibovina (Rütimeyer, 1865 sensu Mekayev, 2002); Bistonia (Rütimeyer, 1865); Poephagina (Mekayev, 2002); Pseudonovibovina (Kuznetsov et al., 2002)

= Bovina (subtribe) =

Bovina Temporal range: Late Miocene - present, 13.7–0 Ma

Subtribe of cattle

Bovina is a subtribe of the Bovini tribe that generally includes the two living genera, Bison and Bos. However, this dichotomy has been challenged recently by molecular work that suggests that Bison should be regarded as a subgenus of Bos. Wild bovinans can be found naturally in North America and Eurasia (although domestic and feral populations have been introduced worldwide).

== Taxonomy ==
=== Placement within Bovini ===
- - Bovini
    - - - Pseudorygina
          (Pseudoryx)
      - - - Bubalina
            (Bubalus, Syncerus)
        - - Bovina
            (Bison, Bos)

Phylogenetic relationships of extant genera
of the tribe Bovini (Hassanin et al., 2013)

The majority of phylogenetic work based on ribosomal DNA, chromosomal analysis, autosomal introns and mitochondrial DNA has recovered three distinctive subtribes of Bovini: Pseudorygina (represent solely by the saola), Bubalina (buffalo), and Bovina.

=== Genera and species ===
==== Extant ====
In 1945 American paleontologist and mammalogist George Gaylord Simpson posited three genera of bovinans. In addition to recognizing Bos and Bison, he assigned the several Asiatic tropical species such as gaur and banteng into the genus Bibos. The German zoologist Herwart Bohlken also agreed with these conclusions, though he believed that the two bison species should be lumped into Bison bison. The kouprey was not included in Simpson's taxonomy, while Bohlken (1958) considered the species to be a hybrid between banteng and cattle.

Below is the Simpson (1945) taxonomy:

- Subtribe Bovina (Gray, 1821)
  - Genus Bibos (Hodgson, 1837)
    - Bibos javanicus (d'Alton, 1823) – Banteng
    - Bibos gaurus (Hamilton-Smith, 1827) – Gaur
    - Bibos frontalis (Lambert, 1804) – Gayal
  - Genus Bison (Hamilton-Smith, 1827)
    - Bison bonasus (Linnaeus, 1758) – European bison
    - Bison bison (Linnaeus, 1758) – American bison
  - Genus Bos (Linnaeus, 1758)
    - Subgenus Poephagus (Gray, 1843)
      - Bos mutus (Przewalski, 1883) – Wild yak
      - Bos grunniens (Linnaeus, 1766) – Yak
    - Subgenus Bos (Linnaeus, 1758)
      - †Bos primigenius (Bojanus, 1827) – Aurochs
      - Bos indicus (Linnaeus, 1758) – Zebu
      - Bos taurus (Linnaeus, 1758) – Cattle

Subsequent taxonomic studies resulted in the reduction of Bibos to either a subgenus or a junior synonym of Bos. As shown below:

- Subtribe Bovina (Gray, 1821)
  - Genus Bison (Hamilton-Smith, 1827)
    - Bison bonasus (Linnaeus, 1758) – European bison
    - Bison bison (Linnaeus, 1758) – American bison
  - Genus Bos (Linnaeus, 1758)
    - Subgenus Bibos (Hodgson, 1837)
      - Bos javanicus (d'Alton, 1823) – Banteng
      - Bos sauveli (Urbain, 1937) – Kouprey
      - Bos frontalis (Lambert, 1804) – Gaur (including gayal)
    - Subgenus Bos (Linnaeus, 1758)
      - Bos taurus (Linnaeus, 1758) – Cattle (including Zebu and Aurochs)
    - Subgenus Poephagus (Gray, 1843)
      - Bos grunniens (Linnaeus, 1766) – Yak (including wild yak)

However recent molecular work on mitochondrial DNA and the Y-chromosome has completely revamped the evolutionary relationships among bovinans. These studies support of not only the inclusion of bison species into the genus Bos, but offer two radically different positions for the European bison. According to the mitochondrial DNA, these studies support the American bison being closely related to the yak, while the European bison is more related to the aurochs. However a 2008 phylogenetic study using the Y-chromosome found the two bison species to form a clade. It also found that the yaks are an outgroup in relation to the rest of the bovinans, supporting their classification in the genus Poephagus. Another study by Hassanin et al. (2013) using autosomal introns found support in the bison-yak clade. This suggests the mitochondrial genomes is result of incomplete lineage sorting during divergence of Bos and Bison from their common ancestors rather than further post-speciation gene flow (ancient hybridization between Bos and Bison). There is evidence of limited gene flow from Bos primigenius taurus could account for the affiliation between wisent and cattle nuclear genomes (in contrast to mitochondrial ones). These phylogenetic studies led Groves and Grubb (2011), who conducted large scale taxonomic analysis on the world's ungulate species, to recommend classifying the two bison species as members of the genus Bos.

Below is the listing of species recognized by Groves and Grubb (2011) with species names following Castelló (2016) from Bovids of the World:

- Subtribe Bovina (Gray, 1821)
  - Genus Bos (Linnaeus, 1758)
    - Bos javanicus (d'Alton, 1823) – Banteng
    - Bos sauveli (Urbain, 1937) – Kouprey
    - Bos gaurus (Hamilton-Smith, 1827) – Gaur
    - Bos frontalis (Lambert, 1804) – Gayal
    - Bos mutus (Przewalski, 1883) – Wild yak
    - Bos grunniens (Linnaeus, 1766) – Yak
    - Bos bison (Linnaeus, 1758) – American bison
    - Bos bonasus (Linnaeus, 1758) – European bison
    - †Bos caucasicus (Satunin, 1904) – Caucasian bison
    - †Bos primigenius (Bojanus, 1827) – Aurochs
    - Bos indicus (Linnaeus, 1758) – Zebu
    - Bos taurus (Linnaeus, 1758) – Cattle

=== Fossil ===
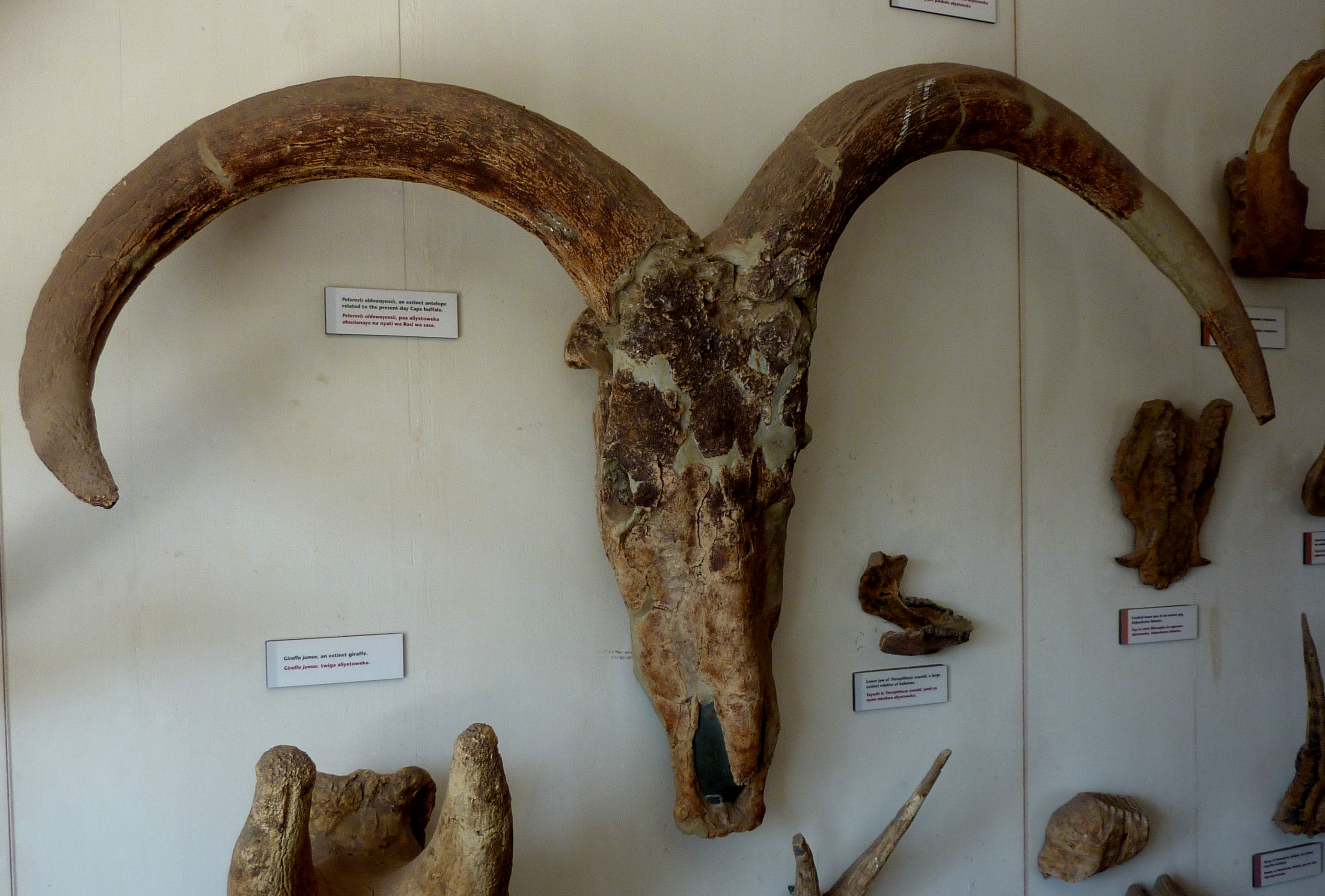
The skull of the extinct Pelorovis oldowayensis, a genus believed to be an ancestor of Bos.

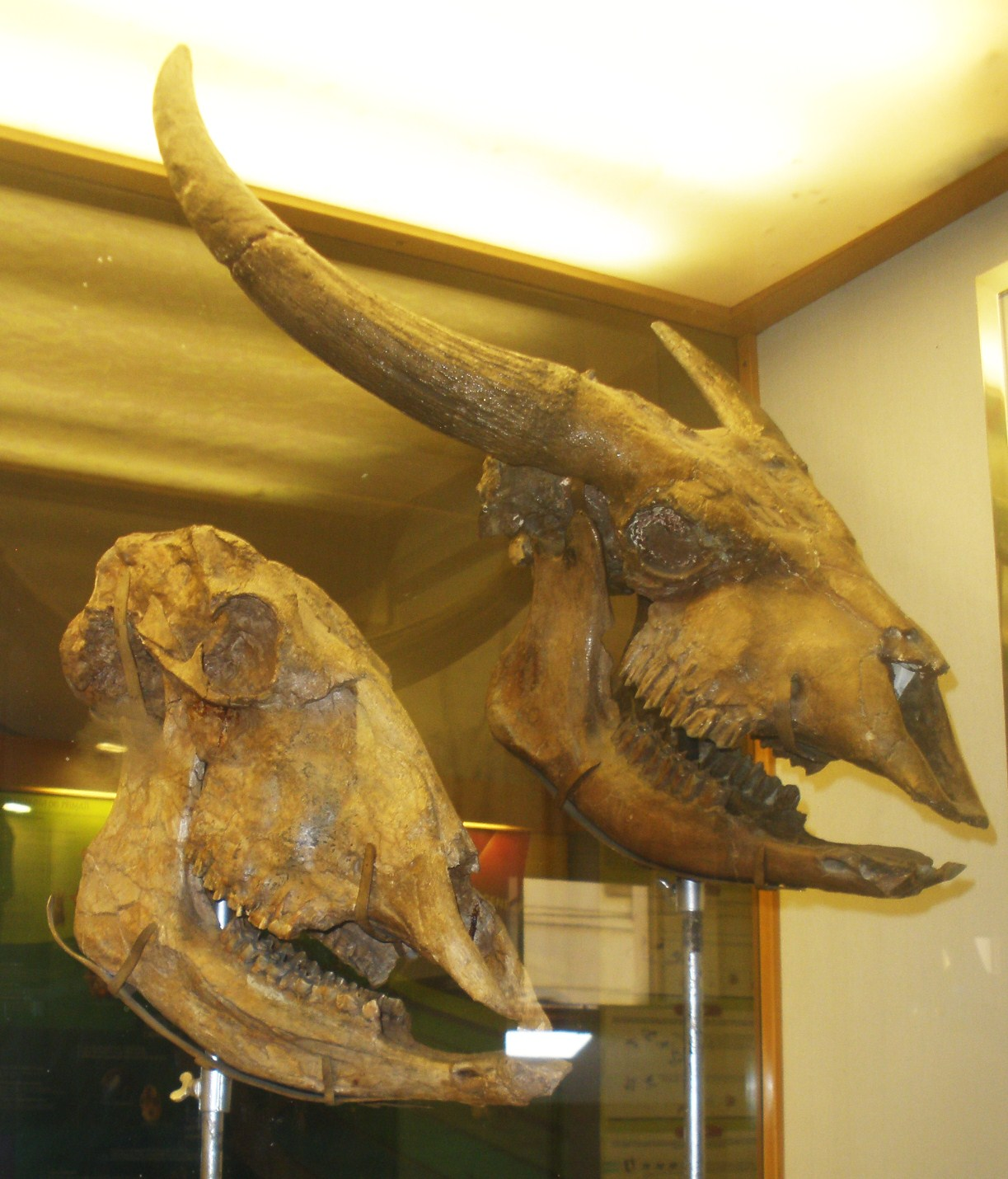
The skull of the extinct Leptobos etruscus, a genus believed to be an ancestor of Bison.

The bovinans have a rich fossil record. According to the fossil record and molecular studies, Bubalina and Bovina diverged from a common ancestor around 13.7 million years ago in the Late Miocene. After arriving into Africa there was a rapid radiation of bovinan species in Africa in the Middle Pliocene. Among the diverse genera of African bovinans were two significant genera: Pelorovis and Leptobos. According to anatomical and morphological study on the various species of Pelorovis and Leptobos, it is believed that the former genus evolved into Bos while the latter genus evolved into Bison during the Late Pliocene of East Africa. Both lineages then left Africa and into Eurasia at the end of the Pliocene. While Bos inhabited much of Eurasia, some species of Bison had colonized North America by crossing over the Bering Land Bridge in two waves, the first being 135,000 to 195,000 years ago and the second being 21,000 to 45,000 years ago. The exact relationships between fossil and extant bovinans are problematic.

Below is the list of fossil species that have been described so far (listed alphabetically):

- Subtribe Bovina (Gray, 1821)
  - Genus †Adjiderebos (Dubrovo & Burchak-Abramovich, 1984)
    - †Adjiderebos cantabilis (Dubrovo & Burchak-Abramovich, 1984)
  - Genus Bison (Hamilton-Smith, 1827)
    - †Bison antiquus (Leidy, 1852)
    - †Bison georgicus (Burchak-Abramovich & Vekua, 1994)
    - †Bison hanaizumiensis (Matsumoto & Mori, 1956)
    - †Bison latifrons (Harlan, 1825)
    - †Bison menneri (Sher, 1997)
    - †Bison palaeosinensis (Teilhard & Piveteau, 1930)
    - †Bison priscus (Bojanus, 1827)
    - †Bison schoetensacki (Freudenberg, 1914)
    - †Bison sivalensis (Falconer, 1878)
    - †Bison tamanensis (Vereshchagin, 1959)
    - †Bison voigtstedtensis (Fischer, 1965)
  - Genus Bos (Linnaeus, 1758)
    - Subgenus Bos (Linnaeus, 1758)
      - †Bos acutifrons (Lydekker, 1877)
      - †Bos buiaensis (Martínez-Navarro et al., 2009)
      - †Bos caucasicus (Burchak-Abramovich & Vekua, 1980)
      - †Bos planifrons (Lydekker, 1877)
    - Subgenus Bibos
      - †Bos palaesondaicus (Dubois, 1908)
    - Subgenus Poephagus (Gray, 1843)
      - †Bos baikalensis (Verestchagin, 1954)
  - Genus †Epileptobos (Hooijer, 1956)
    - †Epileptobos groeneveldtii (Dubois, 1908)
  - Genus †Ioribos (Vekua, 1972)
    - †Ioribos aceros (Vekua, 1972)
  - Genus †Leptobos (Rütimeyer, 1877)
    - Subgenus †Leptobos (Rütimeyer, 1877)
      - †Leptobos elatus (Croizet & Pomel, 1853)
      - †Leptobos falconeri (Rütimeyer, 1877)
      - †Leptobos furtivus (Duvernois & Guérin, 1989)
    - Subgenus †Smertiobos (Duvernois, 1992)
      - †Leptobos bravardi (Duvernois, 1989)
      - †Leptobos brevicornis (Hu & Qi, 1975)
      - †Leptobos crassus (Jia & Wang, 1978)
      - †Leptobos etruscus (Falconer, 1859)
  - Genus †Pelorovis (Reck, 1928)
    - †Pelorovis howelli (Hadjouis & Sahnouni, 2006)
    - †Pelorovis kaisensis (Geraads & Thomas, 1994)
    - †Pelorovis oldowayensis (Reck, 1928)
    - †Pelorovis praeafricanus (Arambourg, 1979)
    - †Pelorovis turkanensis (Harris, 1991)
  - Genus †Platycerabos (Barbour & Schultz, 1942)
    - †Platycerabos dodsoni (Barbour & Schultz, 1941)
  - Genus †Protobison (Burchak-Abramovich, Gadzhiev & Vekua, 1980)
    - †Protobison kushkunensis (Burchak-Abramovich, Gadzhiev & Vekua, 1980)
  - Genus †Urmiabos (Burchak-Abramovich, 1950)
    - †Urmiabos azerbaidzanicus (Burchak-Abramovich, 1950)
  - Genus †Yakopsis (Kretzoi, 1954)
    - †Yakopsis stenometopon (Rütimeyer, 1865)
