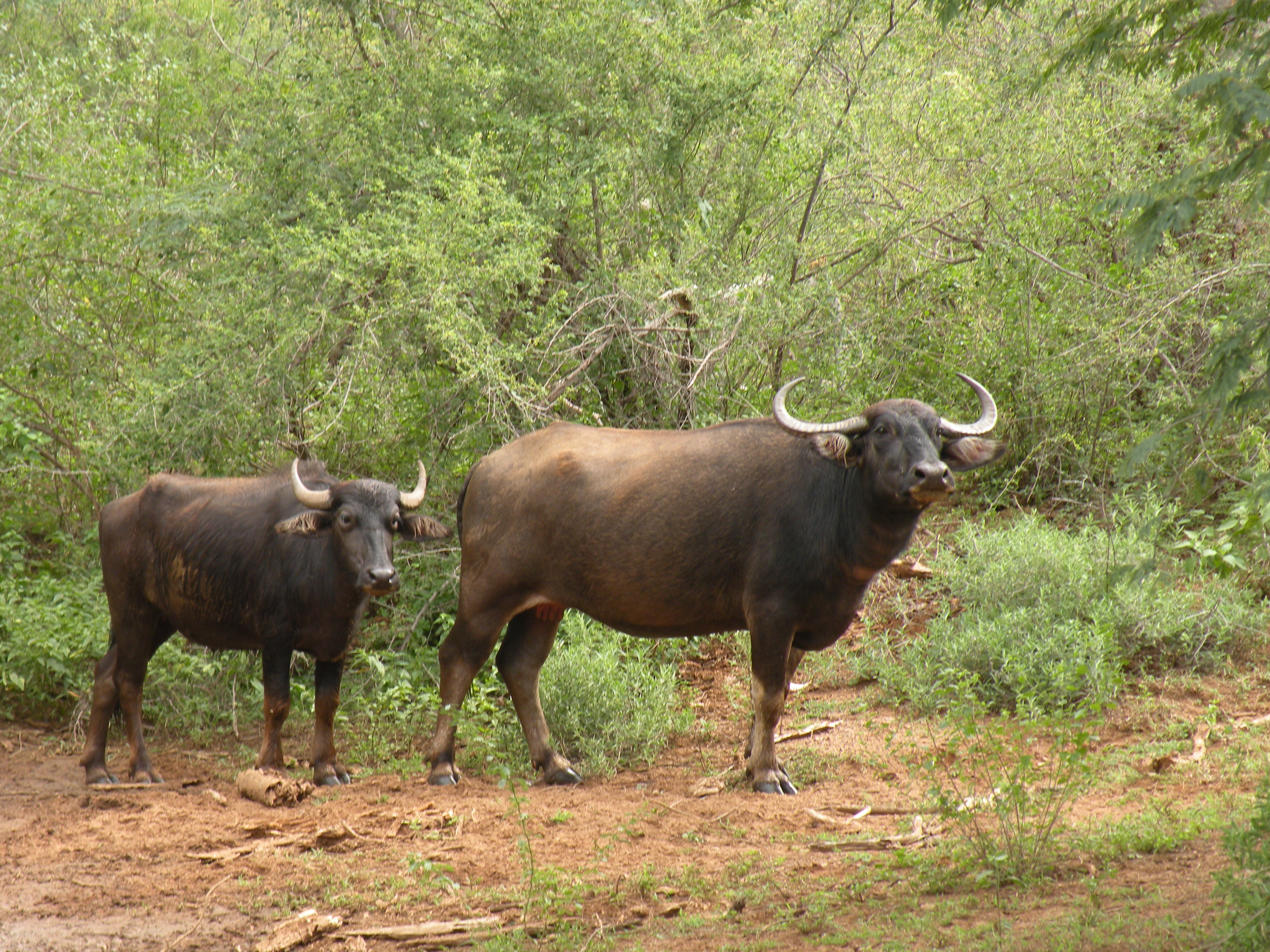
- Feral water buffalo

Scientific classification
- Kingdom: Animalia
- Phylum: Chordata
- Class: Mammalia
- Order: Artiodactyla
- Family: Bovidae
- Subfamily: Bovinae
- Tribe: Bovini
- Subtribe: Bubalina; Rütimeyer, 1865

Type species
- Bubalus bubalis Linnaeus, 1758

Genera
- Bubalus C. H. Smith, 1827; †Hemibos (Falconer, 1865); †Parabos (Arambourg & Piveteau, 1929); †Proamphibos (Pilgrim, 1939); Syncerus Hodgson, 1847; †Ugandax Cooke & Coryndon, 1970

Synonyms
- Buffelinae (Knottnerus-Meyer, 1907); Syncerina (Pilgrim, 1939)

= Bubalina =

Bubalina Temporal range: Late Miocene – present, 13.7–0 Ma

Subtribe of bovines consisting of the true buffalo

Bubalina is a subtribe of Bovini (wild cattle) that includes the various species of true buffalo. Species include the African buffalo, the anoas, and the wild water buffalo (including the domesticated variant water buffalo). Buffaloes can be found naturally in sub-Saharan Africa, South Asia and Southeast Asia, and domestic and feral populations have been introduced to Europe, the Americas, and Australia. In addition to the living species, bubalinans have an extensive fossil record where remains have been found in much of Afro-Eurasia.

American bison are commonly referred to as "buffalo" but are not members of Bubalina.

Live buffaloes

== Taxonomy ==
=== Placement within Bovini ===
- - Bovini
    - Pseudorygina
      (Pseudoryx)
    - - Bubalina
        (Bubalus, Syncerus)
      - Bovina
        (Bison, Bos)

Phylogenetic relationships of extant genera of the tribe Bovini (Hassanin et al., 2013)

The majority of phylogenetic work based on ribosomal DNA, chromosomal analysis, autosomal introns and mitochondrial DNA has recovered three distinctive subtribes of Bovini: Pseudorygina (represented solely by the saola), Bubalina, and Bovina (which today are represented by the genera Bison and Bos). One cytogenetic analysis concerning the phylogenetic position on the saola suggests the species could be related to buffalo. This relationship has not, however, been supported by most phylogenetic work concerning Bovini.

=== Genera and species ===
==== Extant ====
There are currently two recognized extant genera of bubalinans – the African Syncerus and the Asiatic Bubalus. Whilst the majority of molecular and morphological work strongly supports the recognition of these two genera as being sister taxa, since 2011 new uncertainty over the number of species that should be recognized has been introduced. In the 'traditional' classification given by Peter Grubb in the 2005 third edition of the widely used taxonomic reference work Mammal Species of the World the following six species are recognized, with the African buffalo split into five subspecies based on differences in the horns and skin colouration.

- Subtribe Bubalina (Rütimeyer, 1865)
  - Genus Syncerus (Hodgson, 1847)
    - Syncerus caffer (Sparrman, 1779) – African buffalo
  - Genus Bubalus (Hamilton-Smith, 1827)
    - Bubalus depressicornis (Hamilton-Smith, 1827) – Lowland anoa
    - Bubalus quarlesi (Ouwens, 1910) – Mountain anoa
    - Bubalus mindorensis (Heude, 1888) – Tamaraw
    - Bubalus bubalis (Linnaeus, 1758) – Domestic water buffalo
    - Bubalus arnee (Kerr, 1792) – Wild water buffalo

In 2011, Groves and Grubb recognised four of the subspecies of the African buffalo as independent species. These they argued, should be considered as separate species based on the phylogenetic species concept, which states that any population can be recognised as a species if a member is diagnosable as belonging to that population. The African buffalo is noted to exhibit extreme morphological variability, and in the past a number of discrete species or subspecies have been named for specific geographic populations. The bovid biologist Castelló adopted the Groves and Grubb taxonomic interpretation, but others have expressed their concern that this taxonomic proposal needs more additional evidence before being adopted.

Below is the listing of 'new' species recognized by Groves and Grubb (2011) with vernacular names following Castelló (2016) from Bovids of the World: Note other vernacular names have been used by others, and in practice all taxa are simply known as "Cape buffalo".

- Genus Syncerus (Hodgson, 1847)

- Syncerus nanus (Boddaert, 1785) – Forest buffalo
- Syncerus brachyceros (Gray, 1837) – Lake Chad buffalo
- Syncerus mathewsi (Lydekker, 1904) – Virunga buffalo
- Syncerus caffer (Sparrman, 1779) – Cape buffalo

==== In fossil record ====
The fossil record of buffaloes is extensive, with fossils found throughout Africa and Eurasia. According to the fossil record and the molecular work, Bubalina and Bovina diverged from one and another from a common ancestor around 13.7 million years ago in the Late Miocene. The Syncerus lineage and the Bubalus lineage diverged from each other in the Late Miocene, perhaps give or take between 8.2 and 9.1 million years ago. This divergence corresponds to the time when the ancestor of Syncerus had arrived into Africa from Asia.

Below is the list of a number of the described fossil species (listed alphabetically):

- Subtribe Bubalina (Rütimeyer, 1865)

- Genus Bubalus (Smith, 1827)

- †Bubalus brevicornis (Young, 1936)
- †Bubalus cebuensis (Croft et al., 2006)
- †Bubalus grovesi (Rozzi, 2017)
- †Bubalus mephistopheles (Hopwood, 1925)
- †Bubalus murrensis (Berckhemer, 1927) European buffalo, extinct c. 11,000 years Before Present
- †Bubalus palaeindicus (Falconer, 1859)
- †Bubalus palaeokerabau (Dubois, 1908)
- †Bubalus platyceros (Lydekker, 1877)
- †Bubalus teilhardi (Young, 1932)
- †Bubalus wansjocki (Boule & Teilhard, 1928)
- †Bubalus youngi (Chow & Hsu, 1957)

- Genus †Hemibos (Falconer, 1865)

- †Hemibos acuticornis (Falconer & Gautley, 1868)
- †Hemibos antelopinus (Falconer & Gautley, 1868)
- †Hemibos galerianus (Petronio & Sardella, 1998)
- †Hemibos gracilis (Qiu, 2004)
- †Hemibos triquetricornis (Falconer, 1865)

- Genus †Parabos (Arambourg & Piveteau, 1929)

- †Parabos cordieri (de Christol, 1832)
- †Parabos macedoniae (Arambourg & Piveteau, 1929)
- †Parabos soriae (Morales, 1984)

- Genus †Proamphibos (Pilgrim, 1939)

- †Proamphibos hasticornis (Pilgrim, 1939)
- †Proamphibos kashmiricus (Pilgrim, 1939)
- †Proamphibos lachrymans (Pilgrim, 1939)

- Genus Syncerus (Hodgson, 1847)

- †Syncerus acoelotus (Gentry & Gentry, 1978)
- †Syncerus antiquus (Duvernoy, 1851) – formerly a species of Pelorovis

- Genus †Ugandax (Cooke & Coryndon, 1970)

- †Ugandax coryndonae (Gentry, 2006)
- †Ugandax demissum (Gentry, 1980)
- †Ugandax gautieri (Cooke & Coryndon, 1970)

== Feral buffaloes ==
Domestic and feral populations have been introduced to Europe, the Americas, and Australia. Feral buffaloes in Australia are water buffalo of two types: river and swamp buffalo, and live in the Top End. Some have been re-domesticated.
