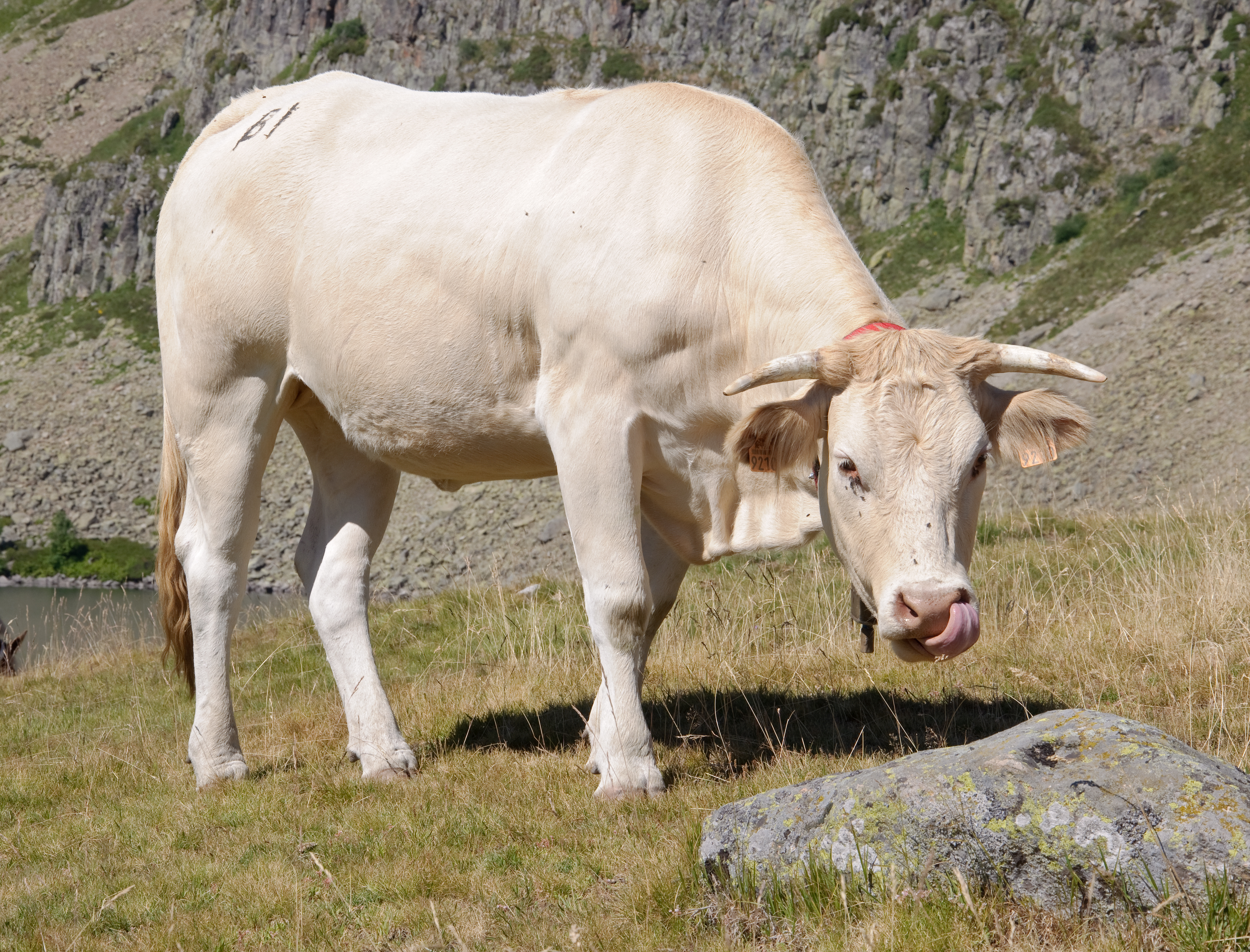
- Domestic cattle

Scientific classification
- Kingdom: Animalia
- Phylum: Chordata
- Class: Mammalia
- Infraclass: Placentalia
- Order: Artiodactyla
- Family: Bovidae
- Subfamily: Bovinae
- Tribe: Bovini; Gray, 1821

Type genus
- Bos Linnaeus, 1758

Subtribes and genera
- †Alephis (Gromolard, 1980); †Eosyncerus (Vekua, 1972); †Alephis?; †Parabos?; †Selenoportax?; †Pachyportax?; †Proamphibos?; †Grevenobos?; †Jamous (Geraads et al., 2008); †Probison (Sahni & Khan, 1968); †Simatherium (Dietrich, 1941); †Udabnocerus (Burchak-Abramovich & Gabashvili, 1969); Subtribe Pseudorygina (Hassanin & Douzery, 1999); Pseudoryx; Subtribe Bubalina (Rütimeyer, 1865); Subtribe Bovina (Gray, 1821)

= Bovini =

Cattle Temporal range: Middle Miocene – present, 15–0 Ma

Tribe of cattle

The tribe Bovini or wild cattle are medium to massive bovines that are native to Eurasia, North America, and Africa. These include the enigmatic, antelope-like saola, the African and Asiatic buffaloes, and a clade that consists of bison and the wild cattle of the genus Bos. Not only are they the largest members of the subfamily Bovinae, they are the largest species of their family Bovidae. The largest species is the gaur (Bos gaurus), weighing up to 1,500 kg (3,300 lb).

Bovins and humans have had a long and complex relationship. Five of seven species have been successfully domesticated, with one species (cattle) being the most successful member of their lineage. Domesticated shortly after the last ice age, there are at least 1.4 billion cattle in the world. Domestic bovines have been selectively bred for beef, dairy products and leather, and serve as working animals. However, many species of wild cattle are threatened by extinction due to habitat loss to make room for cattle farming as well as unregulated hunting. Some are already extinct like the aurochs, two subspecies of European bison and perhaps the kouprey.

== Etymology ==
In 1821 British zoologist John Edward Gray described the family, subfamily and tribe Bovidae, Bovinae, and Bovini respectively. The word "Bovini" is the combination of the Latin prefix bos (written as bov-, which is Late Latin from bovinus) and the suffix -ini refers to their ranking as a tribe.

== Systematics ==
=== Placement within Bovinae ===
- - Bovinae
    - Boselaphini (four-horned antelope and nilgai)
    - - Tragelaphini (spiral-horned antelopes)
      - Bovini (saola, buffalos, bison, and wild cattle)

Phylogenetic relationships of the Bovinae (Bibi et al., 2013)

The wild cattle belong to the subfamily Bovinae, which also includes spiral-horned antelope of the tribe Tragelaphini and two aberrant species of Asian antelope, four-horned antelope and nilgai, which belong to the tribe Boselaphini. The relationship between the tribes varies in research concerning their phylogeny. Most molecular research supports a Bovini and Tragelaphini subclade of Bovinae. There are also some morphological support for this, most notably both groups have horn cores with a pedicle.

=== Fossil record ===
The earliest known wild cattle originated from Asia south of the Himalayas during the Late Miocene. This is not only supported by the fossil record but also the fact that South Asia has the highest diversity of wild cattle on the planet, as well as the fact the southeast Asian saola is the basal most of the living species. At some point after the divergence of the three subtribes around 13.7 million years ago, bovins migrated into Africa from Asia where they have diversified into many species. During the Pliocene epoch some bovines left Africa and entered Europe, where they have evolved into hardy, cold-adapted species. During the Ice Age ancestors of the bison had colonized North America from Eurasia over the Bering Land Bridge in two waves, the first being 135,000 to 195,000 years ago and the second being 21,000 to 45,000 years ago.

Below is the list of fossil species that have been described so far listed in alphabetical order that currently do not fit in any of the existing subtribes:

- Tribe Bovini (Gray, 1821)
  - Genus †Alephis (Gromolard, 1980)
    - †Alephis lyrix (Gromolard, 1980)
    - †Alephis tigneresi (Michaux et al., 1991)
  - Genus †Eosyncerus (Vekua, 1972)
    - †Eosyncerus ivericus (Vekua, 1972)
  - Genus †Jamous (Geraads et al., 2008)
    - †Jamous kolleensis (Geraads et al., 2008)
  - Genus †Probison (Sahni & Khan, 1968)
    - †Probison dehmi (Sahni & Khan, 1968)
  - Genus †Simatherium (Dietrich, 1941)
    - †Simatherium kohllarseni (Dietrich, 1941)
    - †Simatherium shungurense (Geraads, 1995)
  - Genus †Udabnocerus (Burchak-Abramovich & Gabashvili, 1969)
    - †Udabnocerus georgicus (Burchak-Abramovich & Gabashvili, 1969)

=== Taxonomy ===
- - Bovini
    - Pseudorygina (saola)
    - - Bubalina (buffalos)
      - Bovina (Bison and Bos)

Phylogenetic relationships of the tribe Bovini (Hassanin et al., 2013)

The majority of phylogenetic work based on ribosomal DNA, chromosomal analysis, autosomal introns and mitochondrial DNA has recovered three distinctive subtribes of Bovini: Pseudorygina (represented solely by the saola), Bubalina (represented today by the genera Syncerus and Bubalus), and Bovina (represented today by the genera Bison and Bos). According to the fossil record and the molecular work, Bubalina and Bovina have diverged from one and another from a common ancestor around 13.7 million years ago in the Late Miocene.

The number of taxa and their evolutionary relationships with each other has been debated, mainly as there is several evidence of ancient hybridization events that occurred among the various species of wild cattle, obstructing any evidence of their relationships.

Below is the taxonomy of extant genera that are classified as members of the tribe Bovini (more information regarding the species taxonomy is explained more in-depth in their respective subtribe articles):

- Tribe Bovini (Gray, 1821)
  - Subtribe Pseudorygina (Hassanin & Douzery, 1999)
    - Genus Pseudoryx (Dung et al., 1993) – Saolas
  - Subtribe Bubalina (Rütimeyer, 1865)
    - Genus Syncerus (Hodgson, 1847) – African buffalos
    - Genus Bubalus (Hamilton-Smith, 1827) – Anoas and the wild water buffalos
  - Subtribe Bovina (Gray, 1821)
    - Genus Bison (Hamilton-Smith, 1827) – Bison (might be part of Bos instead)
    - Genus Bos (Linnaeus, 1758) – Taurine and Asiatic cattle

== Natural history ==
=== General description ===
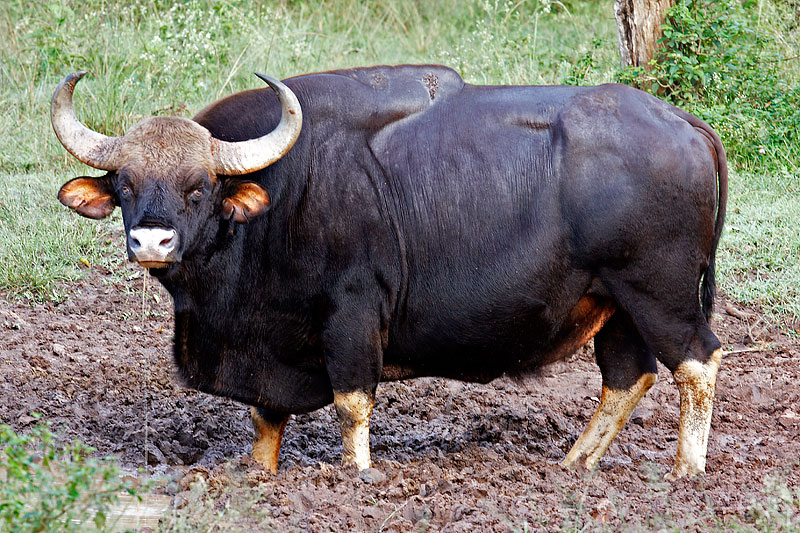
The gaur is the largest species of their lineage.

Wild cattle are usually massive bovids that are stout-bodied with thick, short legs. Some species can reach impressive body-sizes such as wild water buffalo, wild yak, American bison, and European bison, which can weigh between 700 and 1,200 kilograms and these species can attain a shoulder height more than 1.9 meters. The gaur can weigh up to 1,500 kilograms and attain a shoulder height up to 2.2 meters. There are some breeds of domestic cattle that can be even larger than both wild species, one of them being the Chianina, bulls of which can weigh from 1,200 to 1,500 kilograms and reach a similar height to the gaur. There are, however, several species of buffalo that live on the various islands in Southeast Asia are dwarf species, such as the tamaraw and the anoa, that weigh between 200 and 300 kilograms. Furthermore, not all species of bovin look like cattle, such as the saola which looks more like antelope (a fact that caused some confusion among bovid biologists). What all bovins or wild cattle do have in common is both sexes have the presence of smooth horns, instead of annulated horns seen in most other bovids. In bovinans the horns are round, while in bubalinans they are flattened. Like the spiral-horned antelopes there is extreme sexual dimorphism in bovins, though it is emphasis on the body size and the size of the horns. Males are significantly larger than the females, which most of their features are exaggerated with massive humps, large necks, and in some species the presence of a dewlap. Males and females exhibit sexual monochromatism (with the exception of the banteng, where males are a dark chestnut while females are just chestnut), though the male coloration hues are darker than the females. Coloration can be uniform or with some white markings, from black to brown.

=== Distribution and ecology ===
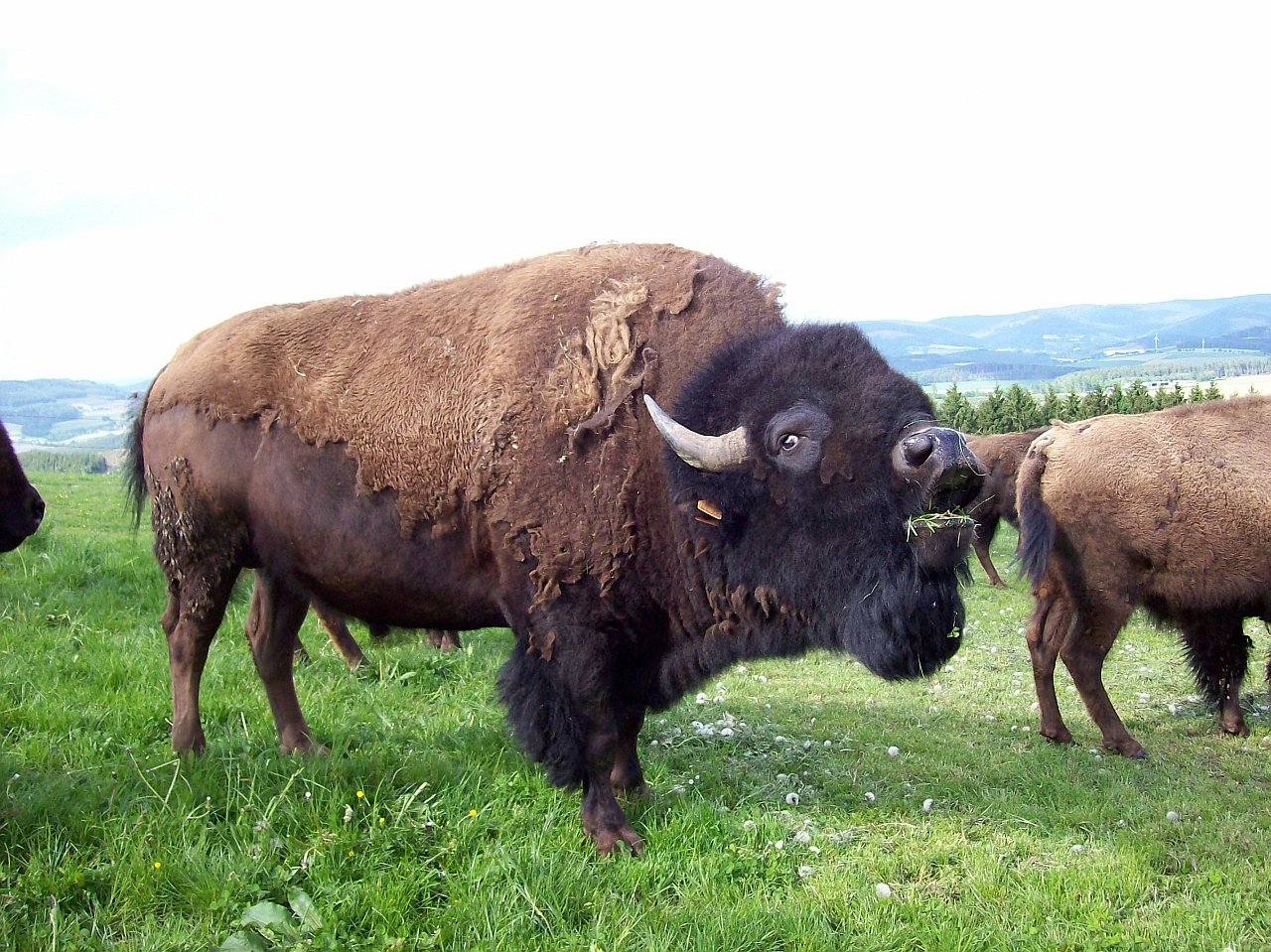
American bison, a species that lives on the open plains of North America

The wild species of bovins are found in North America, Eurasia and sub-Saharan Africa, though domesticated species or variants have a global cosmopolitan range with the help of humans. With the exception of the open-plains dwelling American bison and the montane-dwelling wild yak, all species of wild cattle inhabit wooded or forested areas with some clearings. The reason is that most species require much roughage (often tall grass) in their diet and much water to drink. In addition they are less efficient eaters than smaller herbivores, as they cannot selectively forage on relatively short grass due their stiff, immobile upperlips. They commonly wallow in mud and water in swamps, especially with water buffalo. Forest-dwelling live in deciduous and tropical forests. With their large body-size, wild cattle have few natural predators aside from humans. Still they are often prey to crocodiles, big cats, spotted hyenas, dholes, and wolves. It is often the young and the weak that are commonly selected by these predators.

=== Behavior and reproduction ===
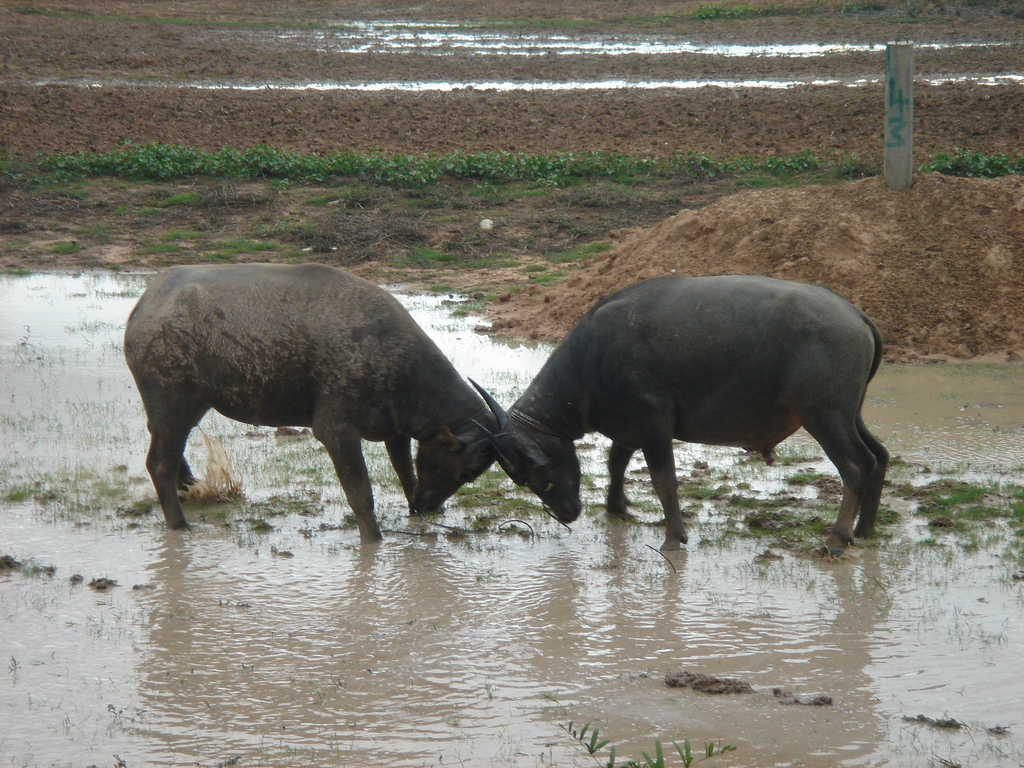
Water buffalo ramming against each other using the weight of their heads and their horns.

Wild cattle are very social animals, which they accumulate into large herds, with some individual sizes that can go into the hundreds. Usually these herds consisted of females and their young, although in some species there are occasionally bachelor males among them. Generally the larger and more experienced males tend to be solitary, though in the breeding season mixed-herds occur. There is a strict hierarchy among males based on size dominance.

All species of bovin are polyandrous. During the rutting period males engage in ramming against each other in order to obtain the breeding rights for females as well as territory. The gestation period occurs once the female has been inseminated from the male successfully. In most species it lasts approximately nine to ten months. They only give birth to a single calf. Once the young are born, they will not wean until they are around six to 10 months depending on the species. Females of most species sexually mature by four years while for males it is seven years.

=== Genetics and hybridization ===
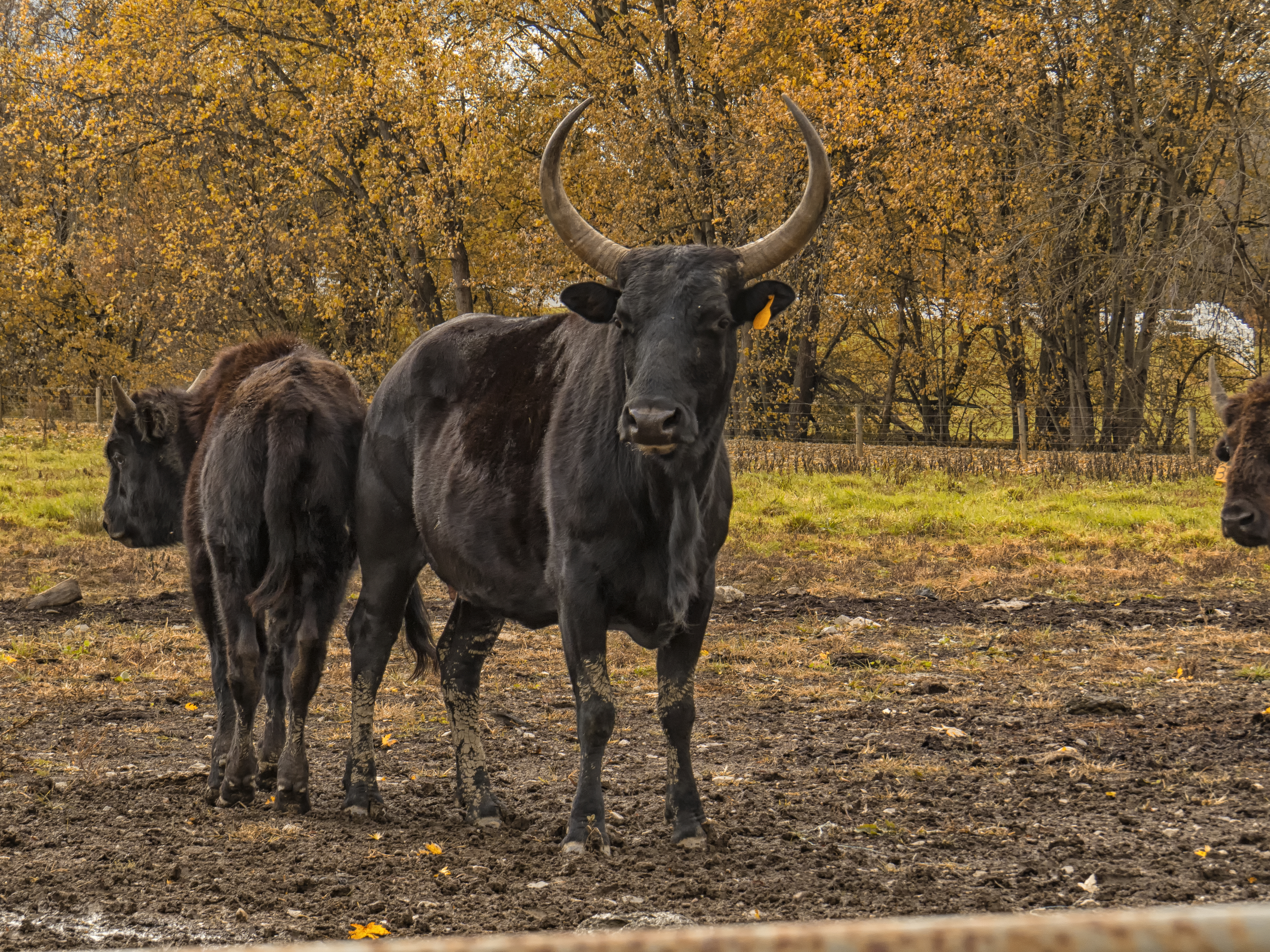
A beefalo and her calf.

The chromosome number varies by species, and sometimes even by subspecies, which warrants further research for taxonomic purposes. The ancestral Y chromosome was probably a small acrocentric, but evolved into several distinct characteristics. The subtribe Bubalina have the acquisition of X-specific repetitive DNA sequence on their Y chromosomes; Bos has derivative metacentric Y chromosomes, and share the presence of shared derivative submetacentric X chromosomes with Bison. Below is a listing of the diploid number 2n of selected species as follows:

- Saola: 2n = 50
- Forest buffalo: 2n = 54
- Cape buffalo: 2n = 52
- Lowland anoa: 2n = 48
- Water buffalo: 2n = 48
- Gaur: 2n = 58
- Banteng: 2n = 60
- Yak: 2n = 60
- European bison: 2n = 60
- American bison: 2n = 60
- Cattle: 2n = 60

Bovin hybridization is most common in the subtribe Bovina, the most well known of these is the beefalo (a cross between cattle and American bison). Most of these hybrids are deliberate from humans wanting to improve the quality of various cattle breeds (in particular for beef production). All bovinan hybrids produce sterile males and fertile females following Haldane's rule. In addition for the agricultural purposes, bovin hybridization was used in the past to save several species such as the American bison in the past. This has caused problems for wild cattle conservation as hybrids pollute the genetic diversity of genetically-pure animals. Bovin hybridization was also a major factor behind the evolution of Bovini, as some species have evidence of ancient hybridization in their genome.
