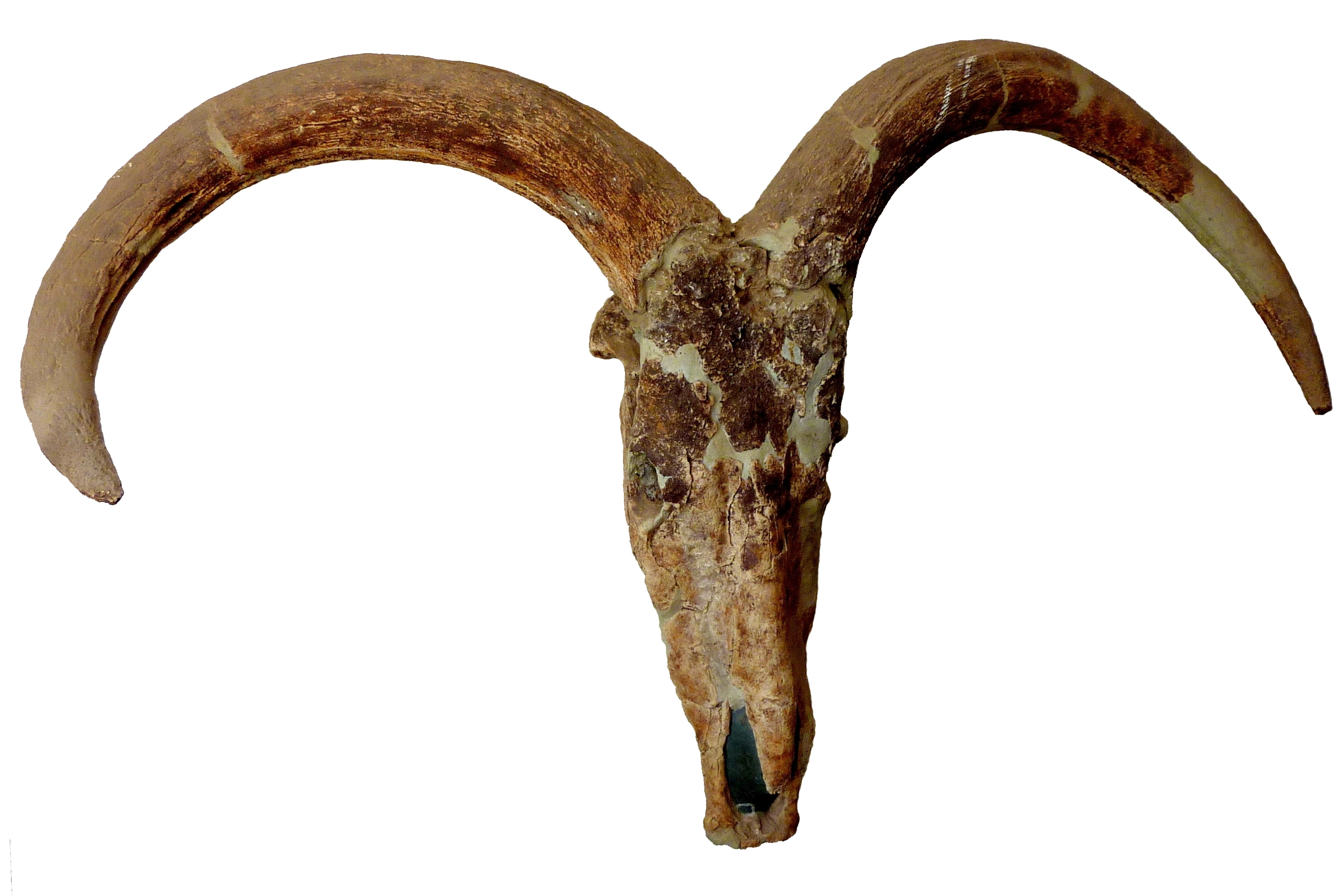
- Pelorovis oldowayensis Skull

Scientific classification
- Kingdom: Animalia
- Phylum: Chordata
- Class: Mammalia
- Order: Artiodactyla
- Family: Bovidae
- Subfamily: Bovinae
- Genus: †Pelorovis; Reck, 1928

Type species
- Pelorovis oldowayensis Reck, 1928

Species
- †Pelorovis howelli Hadjouis & Sahnouni, 2005; †Pelorovis oldowayensis Reck, 1928; †Pelorovis turkanensis Harris, 1991; †?Pelorovis praeafricanus Geraads & Amani, 1998

= Pelorovis =

Pelorovis Temporal range: Early Pleistocene-Late Pleistocene, 2.5–0.8 Ma

Extinct genus of cattle

Pelorovis is an extinct genus of African wild bovines which existed during the Pleistocene epoch. Originally believed to be a giant member of Caprinae, related to modern sheep, it is now known to be a relative of cattle and buffalos. The best known and type species is Pelorovis oldowayensis, from the Early Pleistocene of Olduvai Gorge, Tanzania, though two others, P. turkanensis and P. howelli, are currently recognised. A fourth, P. praeafricanus, may exist, or it may represent the same species as P. oldowayensis. "Pelorovis" antiquus, from the Late Pleistocene-Holocene, and "P." kaisensis, have since been moved into Syncerus, the same genus as living African buffalo.

In many respects, Pelorovis resembles the modern cattle genus, Bos, and has been compared morphologically to aurochsen (Bos primigenius). It has been suggested that they represent the same genus, in which case Pelorovis would be a junior synonym of Bos, though this has been challenged. Assuming they are distinct genera, Pelorovis may be distinguished by having an elongated face and very long, half-moon-shaped horns. It was fairly sexually dimorphic, with males having longer and slightly straighter horns, though horn length and size also differed between species. Pelorovis species grew larger as they evolved: P. howelli had a hornspan of 1 m (3.3 ft), while adult males of P. oldowayensis had a larger hornspan of around 1.8 m (5.9 ft).

Pelorovis was likely a grazer. This was particularly true of P. oldowayensis, which had a broader snout than earlier P. turkanensis, suggesting a greater specialisation for grazing. Tooth wear patterns suggest that it occasionally fed on other plants, which may point towards seasonal dietary shifts.

== Taxonomy ==
=== Early history ===
The holotype of Pelorovis, consisting of a skull (Pel 1) and multiple horn cores and skull pieces (Pel 1–Pel 23), was found in Olduvai Gorge, in northern German East Africa (now Tanzania), by geologist Hans Reck. The expedition in question was the first time the locality was explored by a palaeontologist. Initially, Reck believed that he had uncovered the remains of a large member of the subfamily Caprinae, which includes modern goats and sheep. Specifically, he believed that the fossils he had uncovered represented a close relative of the latter, though one that was quite geographically isolated. The fossils were kept in Berlin, and in 1928, Reck described a new genus and species, Pelorovis oldowayensis, to accommodate them. The binomial name chosen by Reck is compounded from the Greek πέλωρος (péloros) in the sense of "monstrous" or "huge and terrible" and Latin ovis, meaning "sheep".

In 1991, John Michael Harris described remains uncovered as part of the Koobi Fora research project in northern Kenya. Distinguishing it from Pelorovis oldowayensis based on its smaller and more upwardly curved horns, he named it P. turkanensis. In 2004, Denis Geraads, Véra Eisenmann and Germaine Petter further divided P. turkanensis into two subspecies: P. turkanensis brachyceras, and P. turkanensis turkanensis, the former distinguished from the latter by having horn cores with a thick base that quickly taper along their length.

In 2005, Djillali Hadjouis and Mohamed Sahnouni described a third Pelorovis species based on a partial skull recovered from the Aïn Hanech Formation of Algeria. The specimen preserved the upper part of the frontals and parietals, as well as both horn cores. The new taxon was named Pelorovis howelli, after palaeontologist Clark Howell. It differed from the other two species in having smaller horn cores that were set farther apart.

In 1979, Camille Arambourg named Bos bubaloides and B. praeafricanus, both from Aïn Hanech. In 1998, Denis Geraads & Fethi Amani re-examined the remains and tentatively reassigned them to Pelorovis. Thus, P. praeafricanus is occasionally regarded as a species of Pelorovis. However, the syntype of P. praeafricanus, a metacarpal, closely resembles that of P. oldowayensis, and it may represent the same taxon.

=== Possible synonymy with Bos ===
A 2007 study by Bienvenido Martínez-Navarro and colleagues of the morphology of the fossil remains came to the conclusion that Pelorovis is probably not monophyletic. These authors reclassify the early forms of the genus, P. turkanensis and P. oldowayensis, in the genus Bos. In contrast, they find that the late Pleistocene form Pelorovis antiquus seems to be a close relative of the modern African buffalo (Syncerus caffer). This approach essentially subsumes the genus as a synonym of Bos, because the type species is P. oldowayensis. A number of the authors of this study reiterated their classification of the taxa Pelorovis turkanensis and P. oldowayensis in the genus Bos in another paper published 2014. Alexandre Hassanin, in 2014, followed the interpretations of Martínez-Navarro et al., pointing to previous genetics work which show that the bovid lineages which produced the modern species within the genera Bos, Bubalus and Syncerus split from each other some eight to nine million years ago, indicating that either the fossil ancestors of these species have not yet been discovered, or that they already have been found, but are taxonomically misidentified. Hassanin further pointed out that Martínez-Navarro et al. were only looking for the ancestor of Bos primigenius in their studies of African fossil bovids, and that the Asian species of Bos may have been derived from other fossil species. Lastly, Hassanin notes that if Pelorovis is reduced into synonymy due to these studies, this also implies the other Pleistocene fossil genera Leptobos and Epileptobos are synonymous with Bos.

A 2018 study by Tong et al. of the Chinese fossil representation of Bos primigenius uses morphology to dispute these conclusions regarding these taxa belonging to the genus Bos, as well as if they are the ancestral line from which Bos evolved, instead hewing to the traditional interpretation that the Indian Early Pleistocene fossil species Bos acutifrons is the primordial ancestor of Bos.

=== Reassigned species ===
The long-horned buffalo, Syncerus antiquus, was described by Georges Louis Duvernoy in 1851 from a skull discovered along the Bou Sellam River near the city of Sétif, Algeria. It was found at one meter in depth, when excavating the foundations of a new mill, and subsequently sent to Paris. Duvernoy believed this species to be closely related to the Asian water buffalo (Bubalus bubalis) and classified it as Bubalus antiquus. Several other fossils of S. antiquus were described under the names Bubalus bainii and Bubalus nilssoni. In 1949, Dorothy Bate recognized that these buffaloes were conspecific and not related to Bubalus. She placed these fossils in a new genus, Homoioceras. However, the type species of Homoiceros was found to be synonymous with the Cape buffalo, invalidating the genus. It was subsequently moved to Pelorovis in 1978. However, a link with the living Cape buffalo has been noted based on morphological and systematic grounds, and since 1994 it has been suggested that P. antiquus be moved into Syncerus. This proposal has since gained widespread acceptance. Another former Pelorovis species is "P". kaisensis, named in 1994 based on remains from Kaiso, Uganda. Hadjouis and Sahnouni considered it to be closer to Syncerus in 2005.

== Description ==
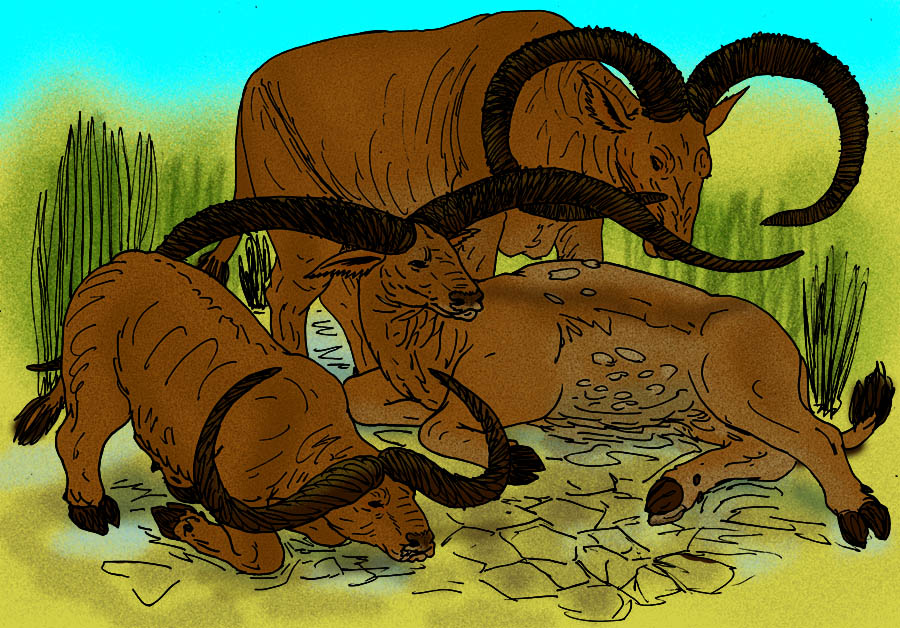
Syncerus antiquus, P. turkanensis & P. oldowayensis (from left to right)

Pelorovis was anatomically quite similar to members of the genus Bos, such as the aurochs (Bos primigenius). The primary difference between the two genera was that Pelorovis was slightly less robust. Early species were fairly average in size, while later species were larger than modern African buffalo.

=== Skull and dentition ===
Pelorovis differs from modern wild cattle in having a relatively long face. Both sexes bore massive horn cores that were elongated and curved sharply, forming a half-circle shape in the case of P. oldowayensis. In females, they were smaller and more curved than in males. The horns of one P. oldowayensis specimen had an estimated span of 1.83 m (6.0 ft), whereas the P. howelli holotype had a span of 1 m (3.3 ft). The horn cores erupted from the skull fairly close together, and quite far back. They were slightly dorsoventrally flattened, and were hollowed, as were the frontal bones. Under the orbital cavity, the zygomatic arch was thickened. The lumps at the front of the basioccipital were unusually far apart for a bovine. The occipital bone overall was low and wide, overhung by the horn cores. The horizontal rami of the mandibles were deep, particularly beneath the premolars and molars. The teeth of Pelorovis were somewhat high-crowned, with rugose enamel surfaces. The front part of the fourth lower premolar had a medial wall. The upper molars had wide occlusal surfaces, with poorly developed styles. Dental cement, a hard tissue covering the tooth root was present.

=== Postcrania ===
Pelorovis' cervical vertebrae are wide and short, with neural spines that do not slant forwards. The vertebrarterial foraminae (arterial openings) on the second cervical vertebra (axis) are small. The humerus is slightly longer than what is seen in buffalos, and is roughly as thin. The radius is fairly long relative to the humerus, more so than would be expected for a bovine of Pelorovis' size. Only two calcanea can be referred to Pelorovis, which are proportionally longer than those of buffalo. The same is true of the talus and metatarsal.

== Palaeobiology ==
Stable isotope studies further suggest that species within Pelorovis were probably C_{4} grazers. The muzzle of P. oldowayensis was broader than that of P. turkanensis, suggesting that it was more specialised for grazing. This is corroborated by tooth wear patterns which suggest P. oldowayensis primarily grazed. However, some wear patterns suggest mixed feeding, possibly indicating a short-term seasonal dietary shift.

=== Possible predation by hominins ===
A bonebed in Olduvai Gorge, Bell Korongo 5 (BK5) preserves a total of 24 mature Pelorovis oldowayensis. Extensively disturbed by either scavengers or water flow, they were initially suspected by their discoverer, Louis Leakey, to represent casualties of a mass mortality event, such as a flood. However, the remains were found across several vertical intervals, suggesting that they were deposited at different times and during different events. Further, many of them bear cut marks, indicating butchery by hominins. In 2015, it was proposed that the BK5 P. oldowayensis died over the course of many years, as a result of natural death and predation, including by humans such as Homo erectus. Though this hypothesis was also put forward by Leakey, he proposed that it was a single mass killing. The long-term model was challenged in 2019 by Manuel Domínguez-Rodrigo et al., who cited dental remains from BK5 as evidence that it occurred as part of a single event, though did not discount the possibility that it was long-term and attributable to seasonal events.

== Evolution and distribution ==
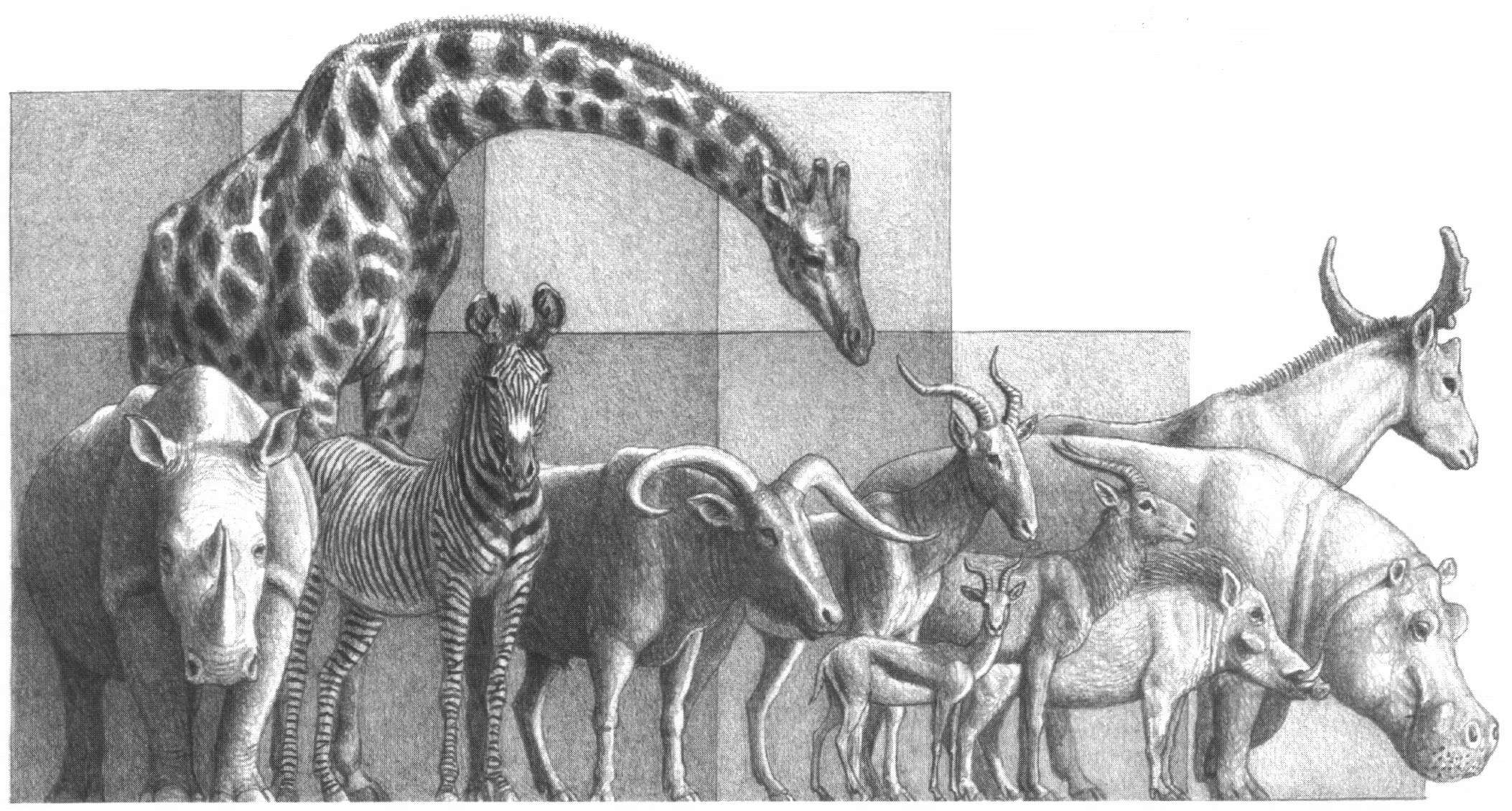
Ungulates from the Pleistocene of Eastern Africa, including P. olduvaiensis

Most fossils of P. oldowayensis are known from the Olduvai Gorge in Tanzania. Further remains are known from Eritrea and the Levantine corridor. Remains assigned to Pelorovis (under P. cf. oldowayensis) have been described from Arabia. The holotype of P. turkanensis was recovered from the Koobi Fora Formation in Kenya. The holotype of P. howelli was recovered from the Aïn Hanech Formation of Algeria. Where and when the genus originated is not certain, though premolar characteristics indicate an origin in Africa. Early species, such as the Early Pleistocene P. howelli, were smaller than larger and later ones, such as P. oldowayensis. By the end of the Pleistocene, Pelorovis appears to have been outcompeted by the long-horned buffalo, Syncerus antiquus.
