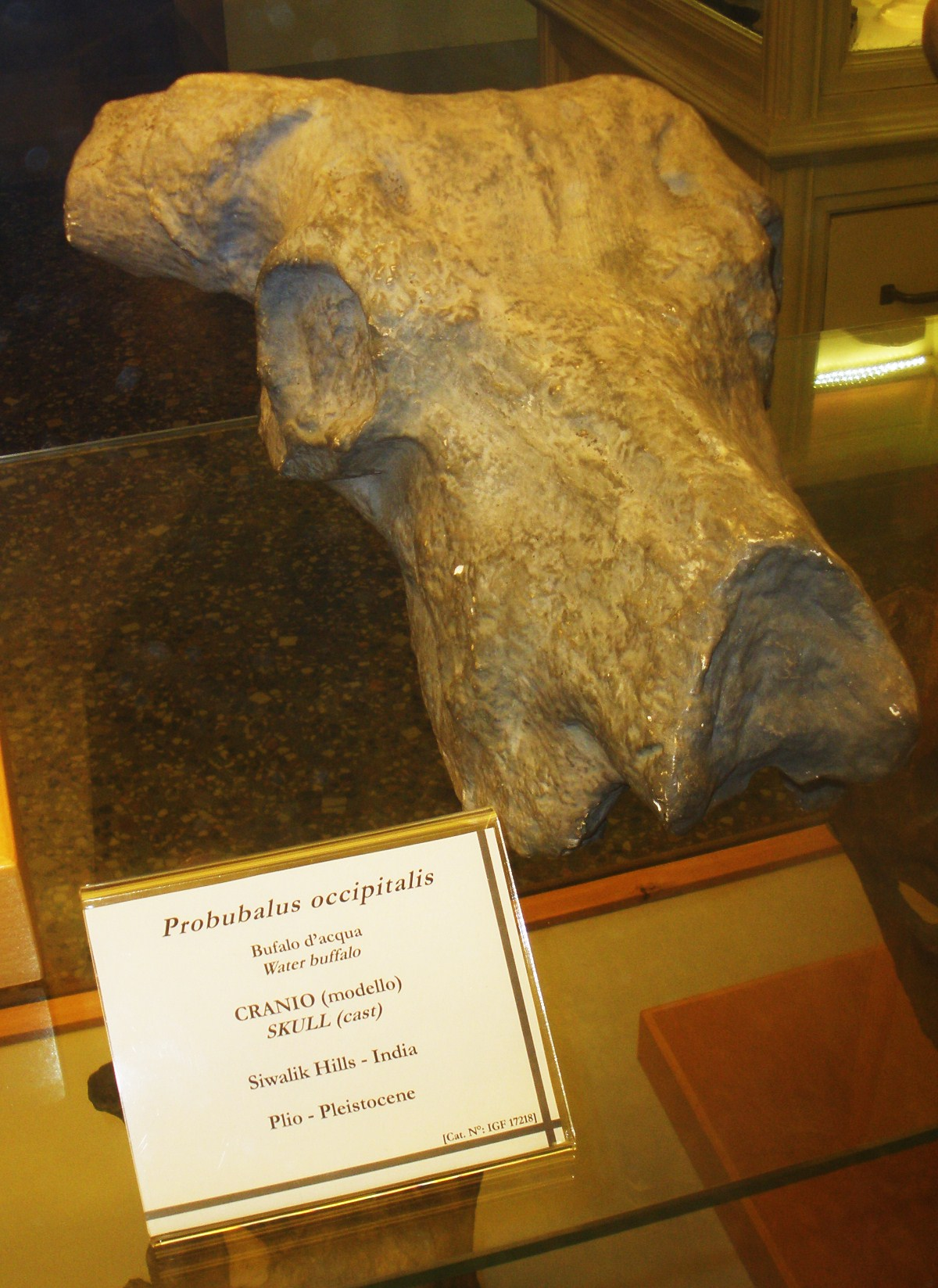

Scientific classification
- Kingdom: Animalia
- Phylum: Chordata
- Class: Mammalia
- Order: Artiodactyla
- Family: Bovidae
- Subfamily: Bovinae
- Subtribe: Bubalina
- Genus: †Hemibos; Falconer, 1865

Type species
- †Hemibos triquetricornis Falconer, 1865

Species
- H. acuticornis; H. antelopinus; H. gracilis; H. palaestinus?; H. triquetricornis

= Hemibos =

Hemibos Temporal range: Late Pliocene - Middle Pleistocene

Extinct genus of mammal

Hemibos is an extinct even-toed ungulate, belonging to the family Bovidae. Its fossil remains were found across Asia and Europe, including findings from China, the Italian Peninsula, the Iberian Peninsula, the State of Palestine, Israel, Pakistan, and India.

== Description ==
This animal was a large bovid similar to the modern Asian buffalo (Bubalus bubalis), of which it is probably ancestral. It was characterized by elongated and non-prominent frontal bones; the bone cores of the horns did not have a neck at the base, and the angle between the horns was variable but usually between 85 ° and 110 °. Also, the orientation of the horns was variable according to the species: the species H. triquetricornis, H. acuticornis and H. galerianus possessed horns directed backwards, outwards and slightly upwards, while H. antelopinus and H. palaestinus possessed different morphologies. The teeth were hypsodont, with increasing development of dental cement; the upper molars were square.

== Classification ==
The genus Hemibos was first described in 1865 by Rütimeyer, based on fossils found in India in Plio-Pleistocene soils. The genus includes five species; three of these (H. acuticornis, H. triquetricornis and H. antelopinus) come from the Pinjor formation of the Siwaliks (Plio-Pleistocene, Indian subcontinent), one (H. gracilis) is known from Gansu (China) in the lower Pleistocene, and another (H. galerianus) is the largest and most recent and comes from Ponte Galeria and Ponte Milvio (Rome, Italy) and dates from the Early Pleistocene/Middle Pleistocene boundary. In lower Pleistocene Spain, a form similar to H. gracilis was found. Another species attributed to Hemibos is H. palaestinicus from Israel, but the dating is not certain and a morphological analysis indicates it may belong to the genus Bison. The species Probubalus occipitalis is considered identical to H. triquetricornis.
