= Epileptobos =

Epileptobos Temporal range: Pleistocene

Scientific classification
- Kingdom: Animalia
- Phylum: Chordata
- Class: Mammalia
- Order: Artiodactyla
- Family: Bovidae
- Subfamily: Bovinae
- Genus: †Epileptobos; Hooijer, 1956
- Species: †E. groeneveldtii

Binomial name
- †Epileptobos groeneveldtii (Dubois, 1908)

Genus of mammals (fossil)

Epileptobos is a genus of large bovines that lived in Indonesia during the Pleistocene epoch. It is one of genera that constitutes "Stegodon-Homo erectus Fauna" which was one of most common fauna assemblage in Java during Early-Middle Pleistocene. Numerous fossils especially head parts have been found from Kedungbrubus, Kedungharjo, Madura, and Wadegan. This species lived alongside several extinct bovids including Bubalus palaeokerabau, Bos palaeosondaicus, and Duboisia.

From what is known, Epileptobos have a low and broad skull with two long circular horns that located well behind the eyes. The horns have long core that curved backward and outward, then upward and forward. It seems that both sexes have horn unlike related genus from mainland, Leptobos, which is said to be hornless in the female. Epileptobos is either a descendant of Leptobos that adapted to insular condition or come from different taxa that originated in Southern Asia since it is said that stem Bovini probably originated from Siwalik Hills.
