= Simatherium =

Simatherium Temporal range: Neogene

Scientific classification
- Domain: Eukaryota
- Kingdom: Animalia
- Phylum: Chordata
- Class: Mammalia
- Order: Artiodactyla
- Family: Bovidae
- Subfamily: Bovinae
- Genus: †Simatherium; Dietrich, 1941

Species
- †S. kohllarseni; †S. demissum Gentry, 1980; †S. shungurense

Extinct genus of mammals

Simatherium is an extinct genus of bovid that inhabited Africa during the Neogene period.

== Palaeoecology ==
Based on dental microwear texture analysis of bovids from the Varswater Formation of South Africa, S. demissum was a mixed feeder. A mesowear texture analysis of S. demissum fossils from the same formation found it to be a grazer.
