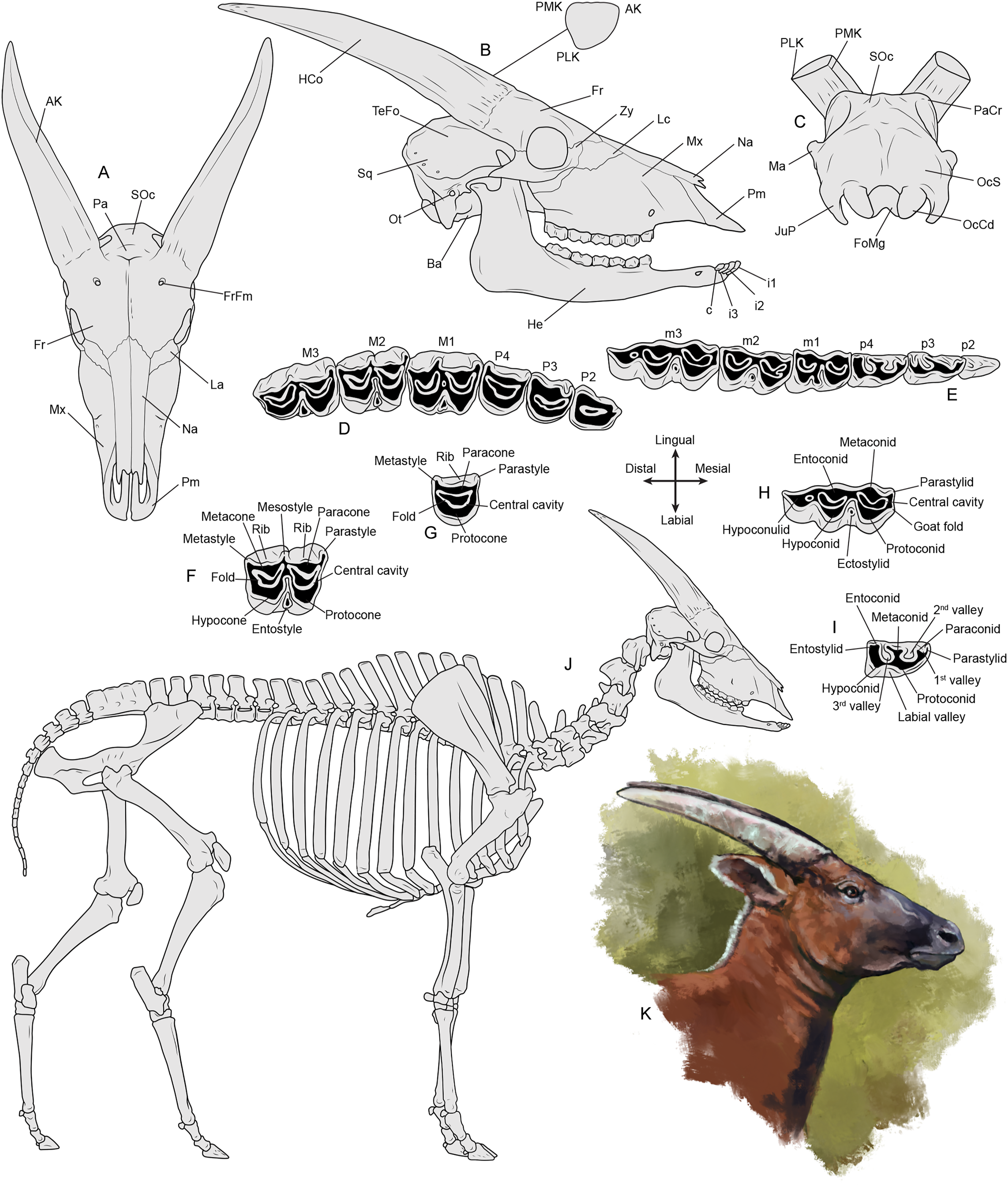
- Skeletal reconstruction and live reconstruction of Parabos tigneresi

Scientific classification
- Kingdom: Animalia
- Phylum: Chordata
- Class: Mammalia
- Infraclass: Placentalia
- Order: Artiodactyla
- Family: Bovidae
- Subfamily: Bovinae
- Genus: †Parabos; Arambourg and Piveteau, 1929

Species
- †Parabos cordieri (de Christol, 1832 type); †Parabos savelisi Crégut-Bonnoure and Tsoukala 2017; †Parabos soriae Morales 1984; †Parabos tigneresi (Michaux et al., 1991)

= Parabos =

Parabos Temporal range: Pliocene

Fossil genus of mammals

Parabos is an extinct genus of medium to large-sized bovine from the Early Pliocene (spanning Mammal Neogene zones 13-16) of Europe. It is disputed whether or not it is an early diverging stem-group member of the tribe Bovini (which includes buffalo, bison, yak and cattle among others), or a member of the extinct tribe Tragoportacini. It is thought to be a close relative of the genus Alephis. Members of the genus were medium-large sized bovines (approximately 500 kilograms (1,100 lb) in the largest species Parabos tigneresi) with widely spaced horns that project parallel backwards from the skull. Largely complete specimens of Parabos tigneresi are known from the Camp dels Ninots lagerstatte in Spain.
