= Bubalus cebuensis =

Cebu tamaraw Temporal range: Pleistocene - Holocene

Scientific classification
- Kingdom: Animalia
- Phylum: Chordata
- Class: Mammalia
- Order: Artiodactyla
- Family: Bovidae
- Subfamily: Bovinae
- Genus: Bubalus
- Species: †B. cebuensis

Binomial name
- †Bubalus cebuensis Croft, Heaney, Flynn, and Bautista, 2006

Extinct species of mammal

The Cebu tamaraw (Bubalus cebuensis) is a fossil dwarf buffalo discovered in the Philippines, and first described in 2006.

== Anatomy and morphology ==
The most distinctive feature of B. cebuensis was its small size. Large contemporary domestic water buffalo stand 2 m (roughly 6 ft) at the shoulder and can weigh up to 1 tonne (around 2,000 lb), B. cebuensis would have stood only 75 cm (2 ft, 6 in) and weighed about 150 to 160 kg (330 to 350 lb), smaller than the extant tamaraw species B. mindorensis.

The fossil specimen is likely Pleistocene or Holocene in age.

== Evolutionary history ==
The fossil was discovered in a horizontal tunnel in soft karst around 50 m elevation in K-Hill near Balamban, Cebu Island, the Philippines, by mining engineer Michael Armas. The fossil was donated to America's Field Museum, where it stayed unanalyzed for almost 50 years.

== See also ==
- List of extinct animals of the Philippines
