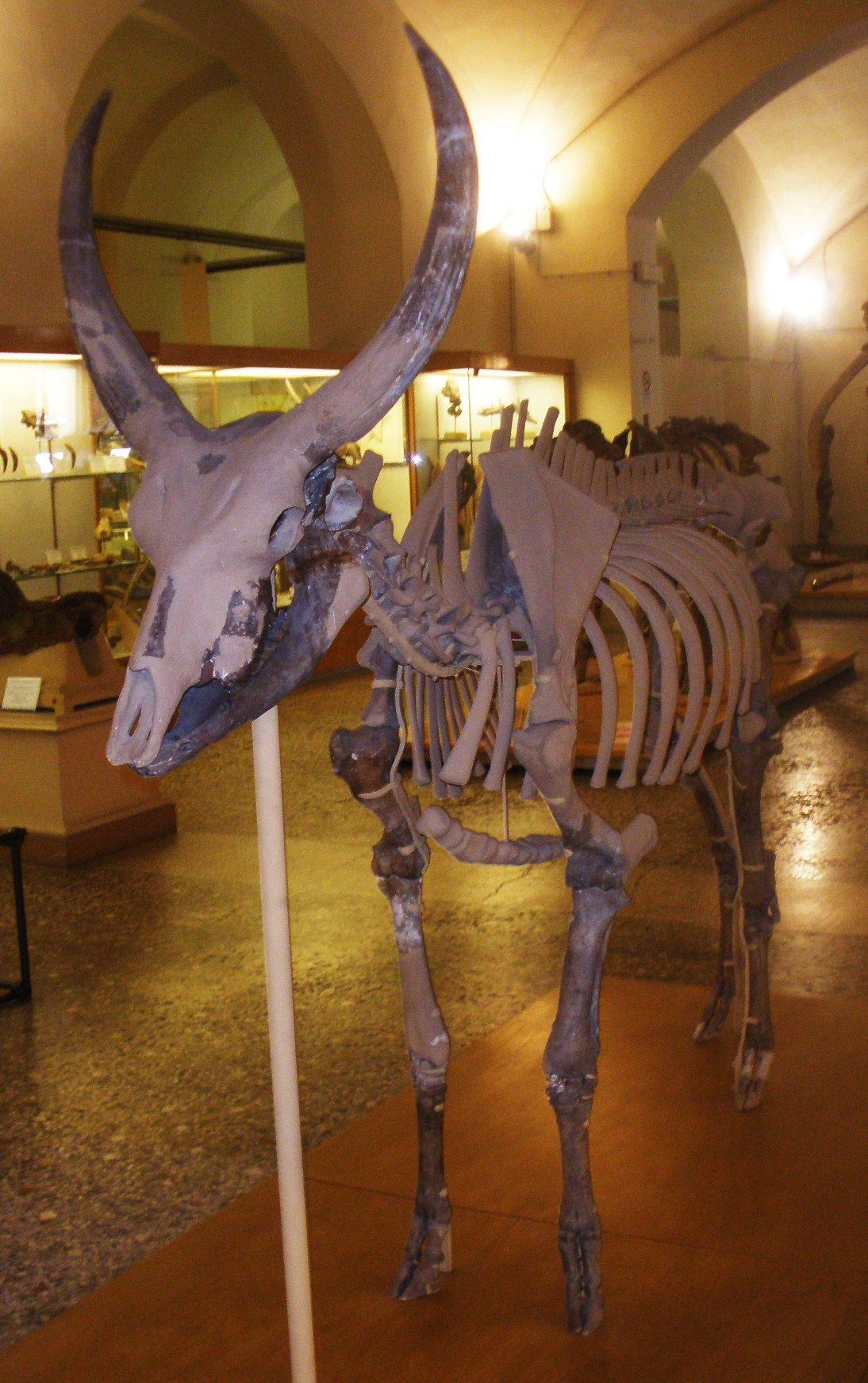
- Skeleton of Leptobos etruscus

Scientific classification
- Kingdom: Animalia
- Phylum: Chordata
- Class: Mammalia
- Infraclass: Placentalia
- Order: Artiodactyla
- Family: Bovidae
- Subfamily: Bovinae
- Genus: †Leptobos; Rütimeyer, 1878

Species
- See text

= Leptobos =

Leptobos Temporal range: Late Pliocene–Early Pleistocene

Extinct genus of mammals

Leptobos is an extinct genus of large bovines, known from the Late Pliocene and Early Pleistocene of Eurasia, extending from the Iberian Peninsula and Britain to the Indian subcontent and northern China. It is widely posited to be the ancestor of bison.

== Description ==
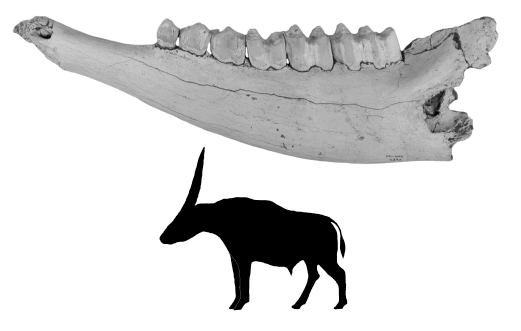
Leptobos etruscus lower jaw and silhouette

Species of Leptobos weighed on average 320 kilograms (710 lb), and have been described as being medium-sized bovines that had relatively slender limbs. The skulls of Leptobos species are relatively long and narrow and have proportionally elongate molar teeth (though the degree of hypsodonty varies between species) Females lack horn cores. In males, the horn cores vary from being straight to somewhat curved, and generally diverge at an angle between 65° and 80° (with some reaching up to 105°) from each other. In a number of species, the horn cores are curved outward, upwards and forwards.

== Distribution and ecology ==
The genus is known from fossils found across the mid-latitudes of Eurasia, from Britain, the Nertherlands, and the Iberian Peninsula in the west, eastwards towards the northern Indian subcontinent and northern China. Species likely inhabited both open grasslands, forests and mixed forest-grassland environments. The dietary preference across the genus includes species that were browsers, grazers and mixed feeders (both browsing and grazing). Damage to a lower jaw of Leptobos brevicornis from the Early Pleistocene of Longdan, Northern China indicates that this individual was predated upon by a big cat, likely Sivapanthera linxiaensis or Panthera palaeosinensis. Other likely potential predators include sabertooth cats.

== Taxonomy and evolution ==
The genus was first named in 1878 by Swiss paleontologist Ludwig Ruetimeyer, with the type species being Leptobos falconeri, named in the same publication based on remains found in the Siwalik hills of the Indian Subcontinent. The taxonomy of Leptobos is contentious. Authors have often accepted L. stenometopon–L. merlai–L. furtivus and L. etruscus–L. vallisarni as two distinct lineages within Leptobos. Duvernois in a 1992 publication alternatively suggested that Leptobos should be divided into two subgenera based on the shape of their horn cores: Leptobos (Leptobos) containing the species L. elatus and L. furtivus and Smertiobos, containing L. etruscus and potentially L. bravardi, though this scheme is controversial has not been accepted by all authors.

=== Species ===
- Leptobos brevicornis Hu and Qi, 1978 (China)
- Leptobos crassus Jia and Wang, 1978 (China)
- Leptobos falconeri (type) Ruetimeyer, 1878 (Indian subcontinent)
- Leptobos stenometopon Sismonda, 1846 (France and Italy)
- Leptobos merlai DeGiuli, 1987 (France and Italy)
- Leptobos furtivus (Duvernois and Guerin, 1989 (France also possibly Italy)
- Leptobos etruscus Falconer, 1859 (Spain, France, Italy, Greece, Romania, and Georgia)
  - Leptobos etruscus etruscus
  - Leptobos etruscus flerovi Vislobokova, Titov & Yarmolchyk, 2026 (Crimea)
- Leptobos vallisarni Merla, 1949 (Italy and China)

Leptobos is considered to be closely related to the insular genus Epileptobos from the Pleistocene of Java, which may be a descendant of Leptobos. "Leptobos" syrticus from Libya likely belongs in a different genus.

=== Evolution ===
The first appearance of Leptobos in Europe around 3.6-3.5 million years ago is considered to define the beginning of the Villafranchian European faunal stage. Leptobos is widely considered to be ancestral to Bison, which first appeared in Asia at the beginning of the Pleistocene around 2.6 million years ago, though support for this view is not universal, with some scholars suggesting that Leptobos is a closely related but separate lineage not directly ancestral to Bison. The earliest appearance of Leptobos in China dates to around 2.55-2.14 million years ago. Leptobos became extinct in Europe during the latter part of the Early Pleistocene, around 1.7-1.5 million years ago, being replaced by their descendants of the genus Bison following a period of coexistence. In China, the youngest records date to around 0.8 million years ago at the Yunxian Man Site in Hubei, at the very end of the Early Pleistocene.
