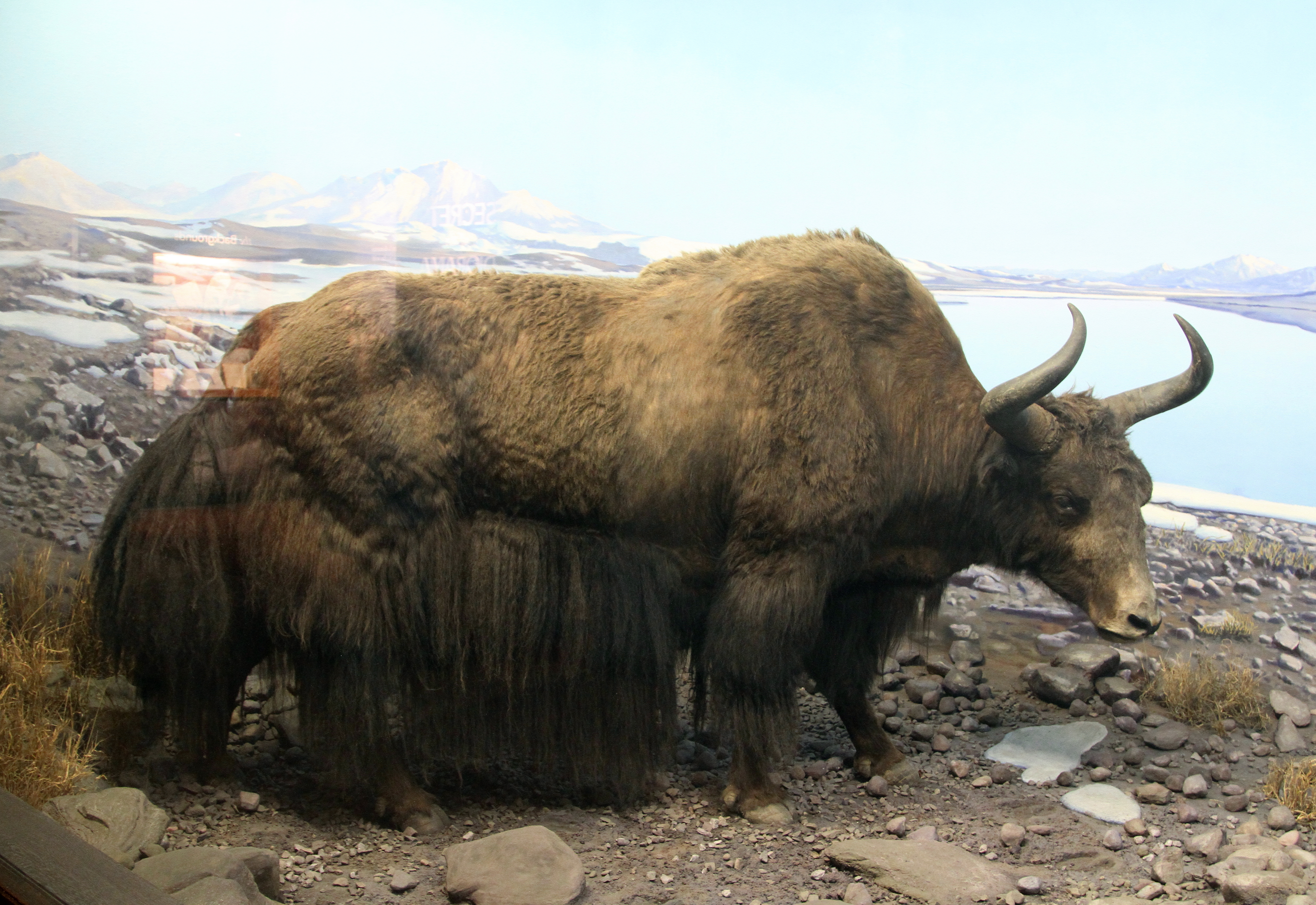
- Stuffed specimen in the ANSP, Pennsylvania

Conservation status
- Vulnerable (IUCN 3.1)
- CITES Appendix I

Scientific classification
- Kingdom: Animalia
- Phylum: Chordata
- Class: Mammalia
- Order: Artiodactyla
- Family: Bovidae
- Subfamily: Bovinae
- Genus: Bos
- Species: B. mutus

Binomial name
- Bos mutus Przewalski, 1883
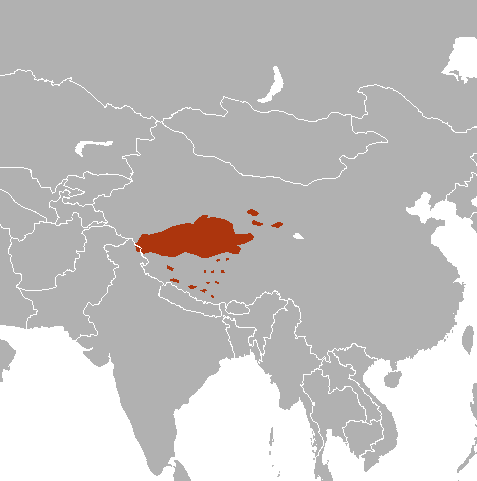
- Distribution of wild yak

Synonyms
- Species Level: Poephagus mutus; Subspecies Level: Bos grunniens mutus; Bos primigenius mutus; Poephagus grunniens mutus

= Wild yak =

Wild yak Temporal range: 5–0 Ma Early Pliocene – Recent

Species of mammal

The wild yak (Bos mutus) is a large, wild bovine native to the Himalayas. It is the ancestor of the domestic yak (Bos grunniens).

== Evolution ==
The ancestor of the wild and domestic yak is thought to have genetically diverged from the aurochs (Bos primigenius) between one and five million years ago. The wild yak is now normally treated as a separate species from the domestic yak (Bos grunniens). Based on genomic evidence, the closest relatives of yaks are considered to be bison, which have historically been considered members of their own titular genus, rendering the genus Bos paraphyletic.

Relationships of members of the genus Bos based on nuclear genomes:

- Bos
  - Aurochs Bos primigenius and Cattle B. taurus
  - - - Wild yak B. mutus
      - - American bison Bison bison
        - European bison Bison bonasus
    - - Banteng Bos javanicus
      - Gaur Bos gaurus
      - Kouprey Bos sauveli

== Description ==
The wild yak is heavily built with a bulky frame, sturdy legs, and rounded cloven hooves. To protect against the cold, the udder in females and the scrotum in males are small, and covered in a layer of hair. Females have four teats. Both sexes have long shaggy hair, with a dense woolly undercoat over the chest, flanks, and thighs for insulation against the cold. In males especially, this undercoat may form a long "skirt" that can reach the ground. The tail is long and horse-like, and the coat is typically black or dark brown, covering most of the body, with a grey muzzle. Wild golden-brown individuals have been reported, which are known as the wild golden yak (Chinese: 金色野牦牛; pinyin: jīnsèyě máoniú). It is considered an endangered subspecies in China, with an estimated population of 170 wild individuals. Two morphological types have been identified, so-called Qilian and Kunlun.

The wild yak is among the largest extant bovid species. Adults stand about 160 to 205 cm (63 to 81 in) tall at the shoulder, and weigh 0.5–1.2 t (0.55–1.32 short tons). The head and body length is 240 to 380 cm (94 to 150 in), not counting the tail of 60 to 100 cm (24 to 39 in). The females are about one-third the weight and are about 30% smaller in their linear dimensions when compared to bull wild yaks. Domesticated yaks are somewhat smaller.

== Distribution and habitat ==
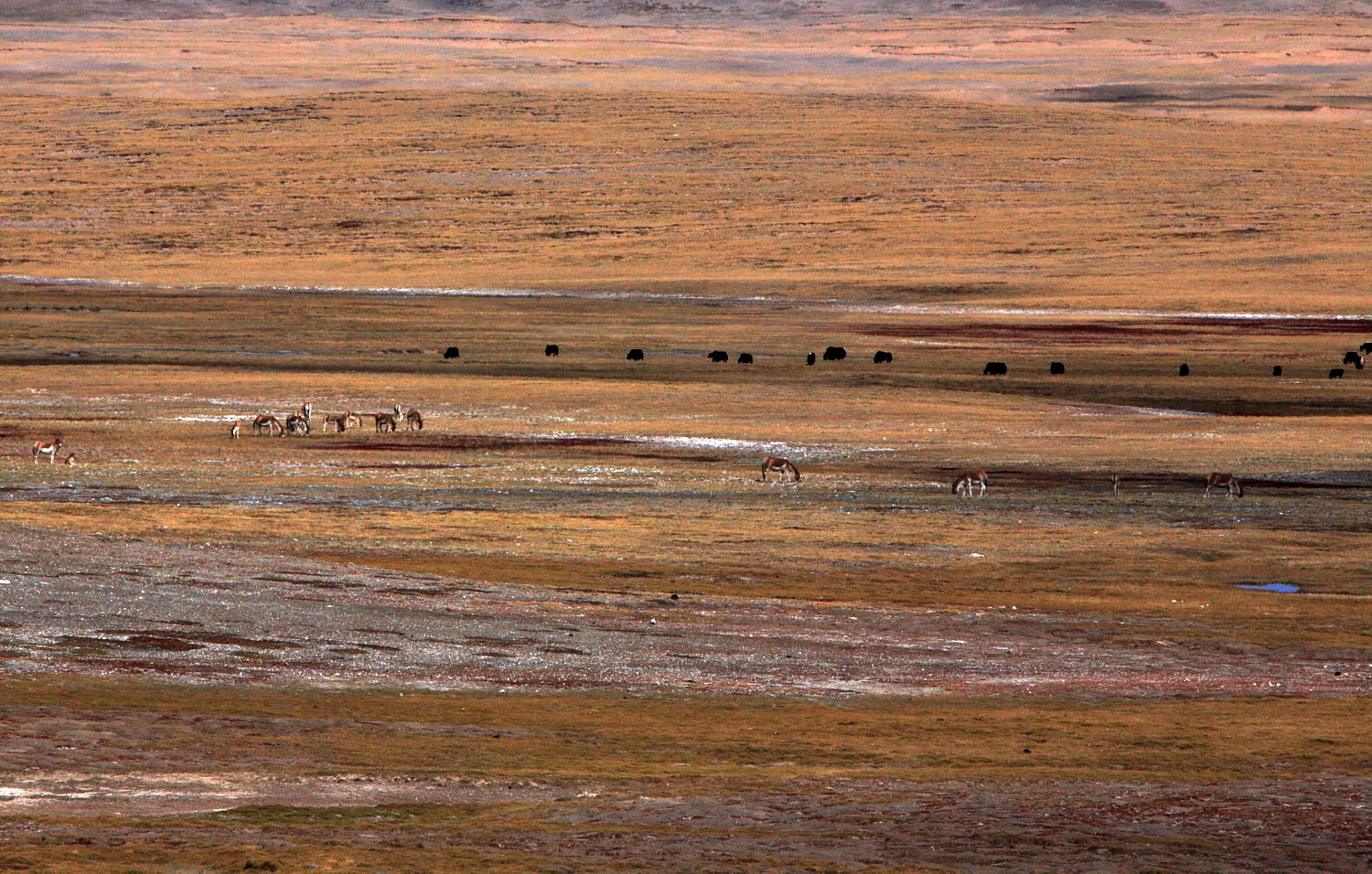
A herd of wild yaks alongside a herd of kiangs on the Tibetan Plateau

The wild yak once ranged up to southern Siberia to the east of Lake Baikal. Fossil remains were recovered in Denisova Cave. Today, the wild yak occurs primarily in northern Tibet and western Qinghai, extending into the southernmost parts of Xinjiang and into Ladakh in India; small, isolated populations of wild yak also live farther afield, primarily in western Tibet and eastern Qinghai. It was thought to be regionally extinct in Nepal in the 1970s, but was rediscovered in Humla in 2014.

The primary habitat of the wild yak consists of treeless uplands between 3,000 and 5,500 m (9,800 and 18,000 ft), dominated by mountains and plateaus. It's most common in alpine tundra with a relatively thick carpet of grasses and sedges rather than the more barren steppe country.

The wild yak is considered extinct in Bhutan, and also in Kazakhstan, Mongolia and southern Russia, but it's not certain whether it occurred in these countries after the year 1500.

== Behaviour and ecology ==
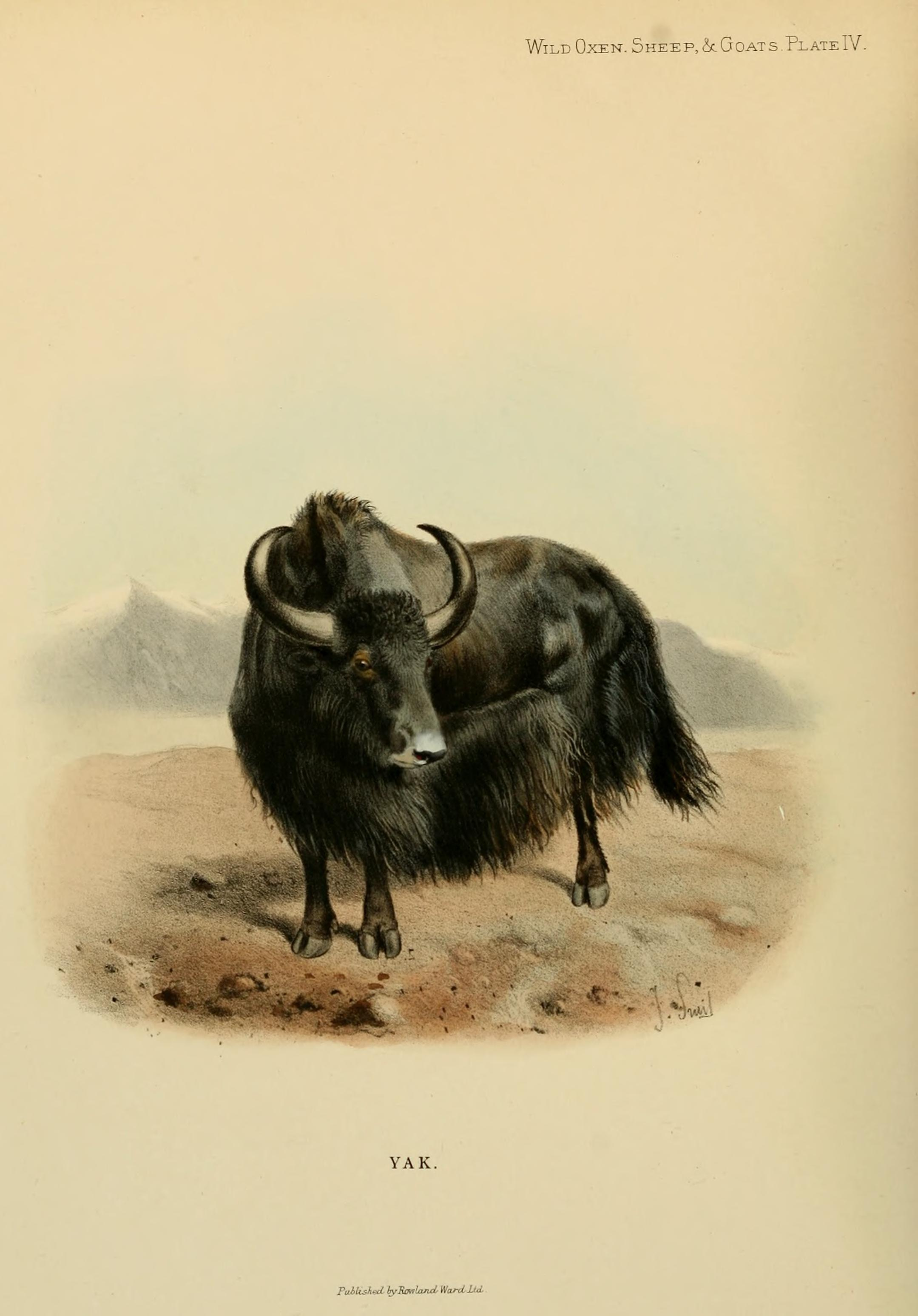
A painting of a wild yak, published by Rowland Ward LTD in 1898.

The diet of wild yaks consists largely of grasses and sedges, such as Carex, Stipa, and Kobresia. They also eat a smaller amount of herbs, winterfat shrubs, and mosses, and have even been reported to eat lichen. Historically, the main natural predator of the wild yak has been the Himalayan wolf, but Himalayan black bears, Himalayan brown bears and snow leopards have also been reported as predators in some areas, likely of young or infirm wild yaks. Thubten Jigme Norbu, the elder brother of the 14th Dalai Lama, reported on his journey from Kumbum in Amdo to Lhasa in 1950:

Before long I was to see the vast herds of drongs with my own eyes. The sight of those beautiful and powerful beasts who from time immemorial have made their home on Tibet's high and barren plateaux never ceased to fascinate me. Somehow these shy creatures manage to sustain themselves on the stunted grass roots which is all that nature provides in those parts. And what a wonderful sight it is to see a great herd of them plunging head down in a wild gallop across the steppes. The earth shakes under their heels and a vast cloud of dust marks their passage. At nights they will protect themselves from the cold by huddling up together, with the calves in the centre. They will stand like this in a snow-storm, pressed so close together that the condensation from their breath rises into the air like a column of steam. The nomads have occasionally tried to bring up young drongs as domestic animals, but they have never entirely succeeded. Somehow once they live together with human beings they seem to lose their astonishing strength and powers of endurance; and they are no use at all as pack animals, because their backs immediately get sore. Their immemorial relationship with humans has therefore remained that of game and hunter, for their flesh is very tasty.

— Thubten Norbu, Tibet is My Country

Wild yaks are herd animals. Herds can contain several hundred individuals, although many are much smaller. Herds consist primarily of females and their young, with a smaller number of adult males. On average female yaks graze 100m higher than males. Females with young tend to choose grazing ground on high, steep slopes. The remaining males are either solitary, or found in much smaller groups, averaging around six individuals. Groups move into lower altitude ranges during the winter. Although wild yaks can become aggressive when defending young, or during the rut, they generally avoid humans, and may flee for great distances if approached.

=== Reproduction ===
Wild yaks mate in summer and give birth to a single calf the following spring. Females typically only give birth every other year.

== Conservation ==
The wild yak is currently listed as Vulnerable on the IUCN Red List. It was previously classified as Endangered, but was downlisted in 1996 based on the estimated rate of population decline and current population sizes. The latest assessment in 2008 suggested a total population of no more than 10,000 mature individuals.

The wild yak is experiencing threats applied by several sources. Poaching, including commercial poaching, has remained the most serious threat; males are particularly affected because of their more solitary habits. Disturbance by and interbreeding with livestock herds is also common. This may include the transmission of cattle-borne diseases, although no direct evidence of this has yet been found. Conflicts with herders themselves, as in preventive and retaliatory killings for abduction of domestic yaks by wild herds, also occur but appear to be relatively rare. Recent protection from poaching particularly appears to have stabilized or even increased population sizes in several areas, leading to the IUCN downlisting in 2008. In both China and India, the species is officially protected; in China it is present in a number of large nature reserves.

== Impact on humans ==
The wild yak is a reservoir for zoonotic diseases of both bacterial and viral origins. Such bacterial diseases include anthrax, botulism, tetanus, and tuberculosis.
