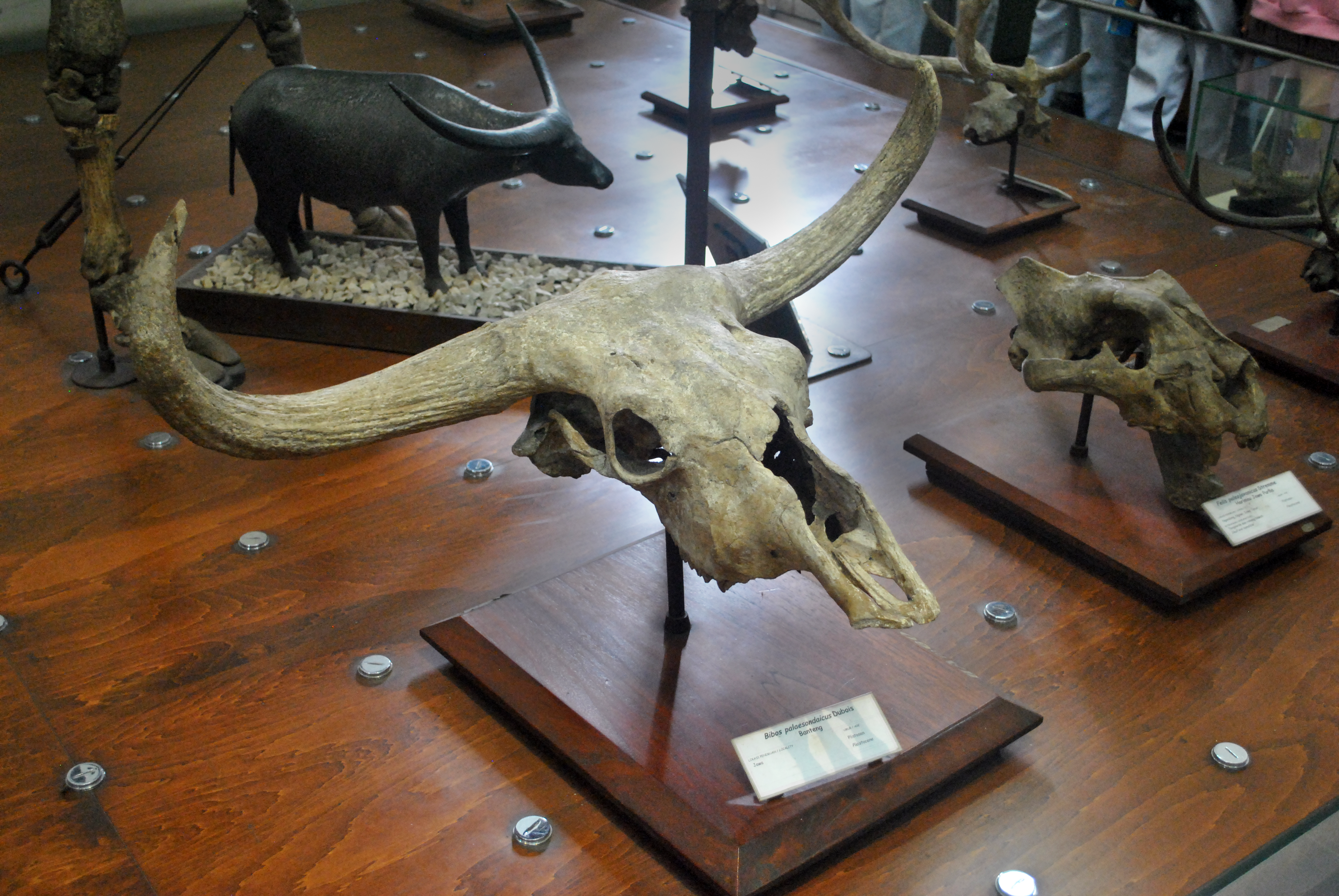
- Bos palaesondaicus skull at the Bandung Geological Museum.
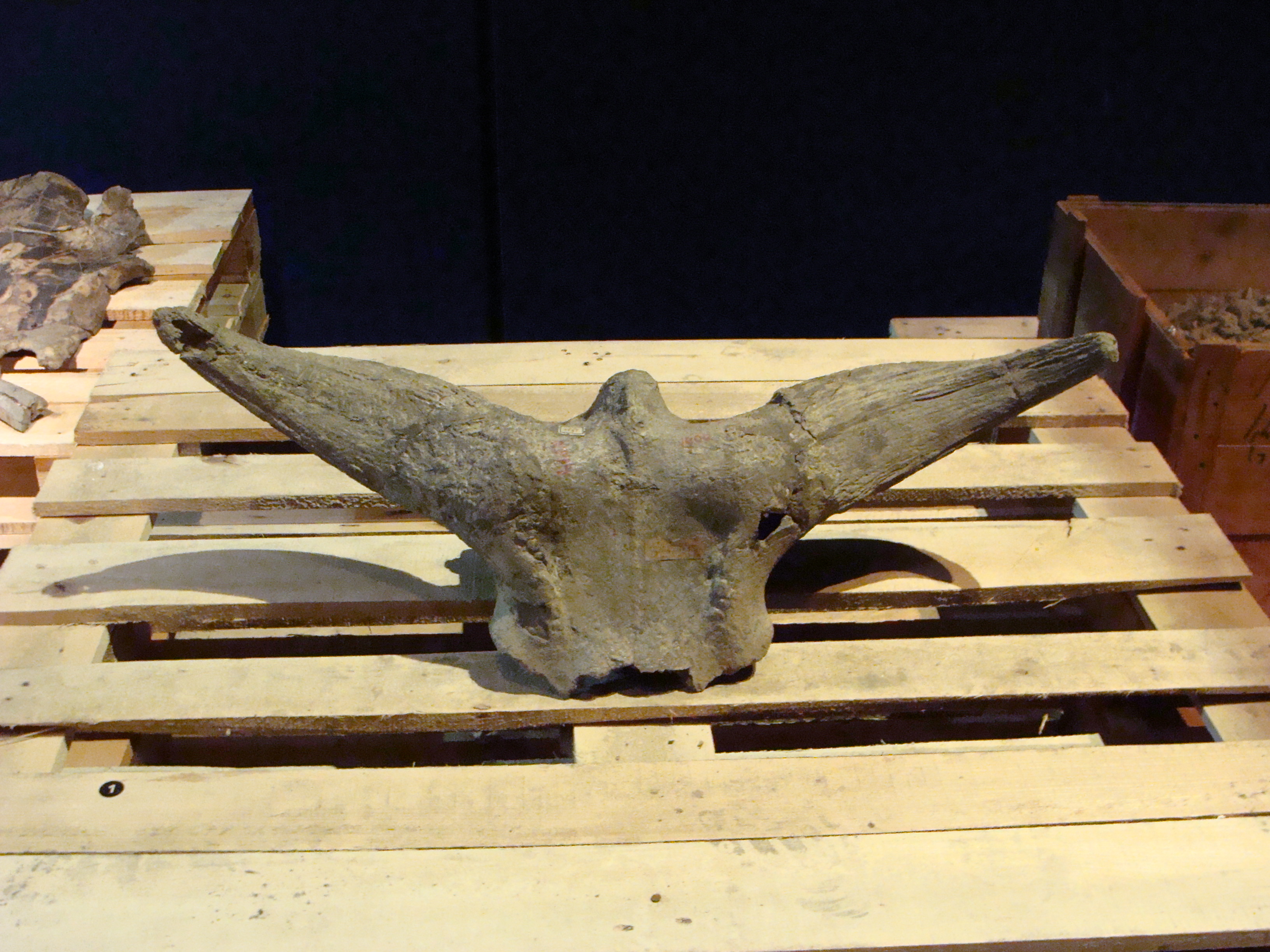
- Partial skull at Naturalis.

Scientific classification
- Domain: Eukaryota
- Kingdom: Animalia
- Phylum: Chordata
- Class: Mammalia
- Order: Artiodactyla
- Family: Bovidae
- Subfamily: Bovinae
- Genus: Bos
- Species: †B. palaesondaicus

Binomial name
- †Bos palaesondaicus (Dubois, 1908)

Synonyms
- Bibos palaesondaicus Dubois, 1908

= Bos palaesondaicus =

Bos palaesondaicus Temporal range: Pleistocene

Extinct species of mammal

Bos palaesondaicus occurred on Pleistocene Java (Indonesia) and belongs to the Bovinae subfamily. It has been described by the Dutch paleoanthropologist Eugène Dubois in 1908. The holotype of Bos palaesondaicus is a skull from Trinil. This species is the likely ancestor to the banteng (Bos javanicus).
