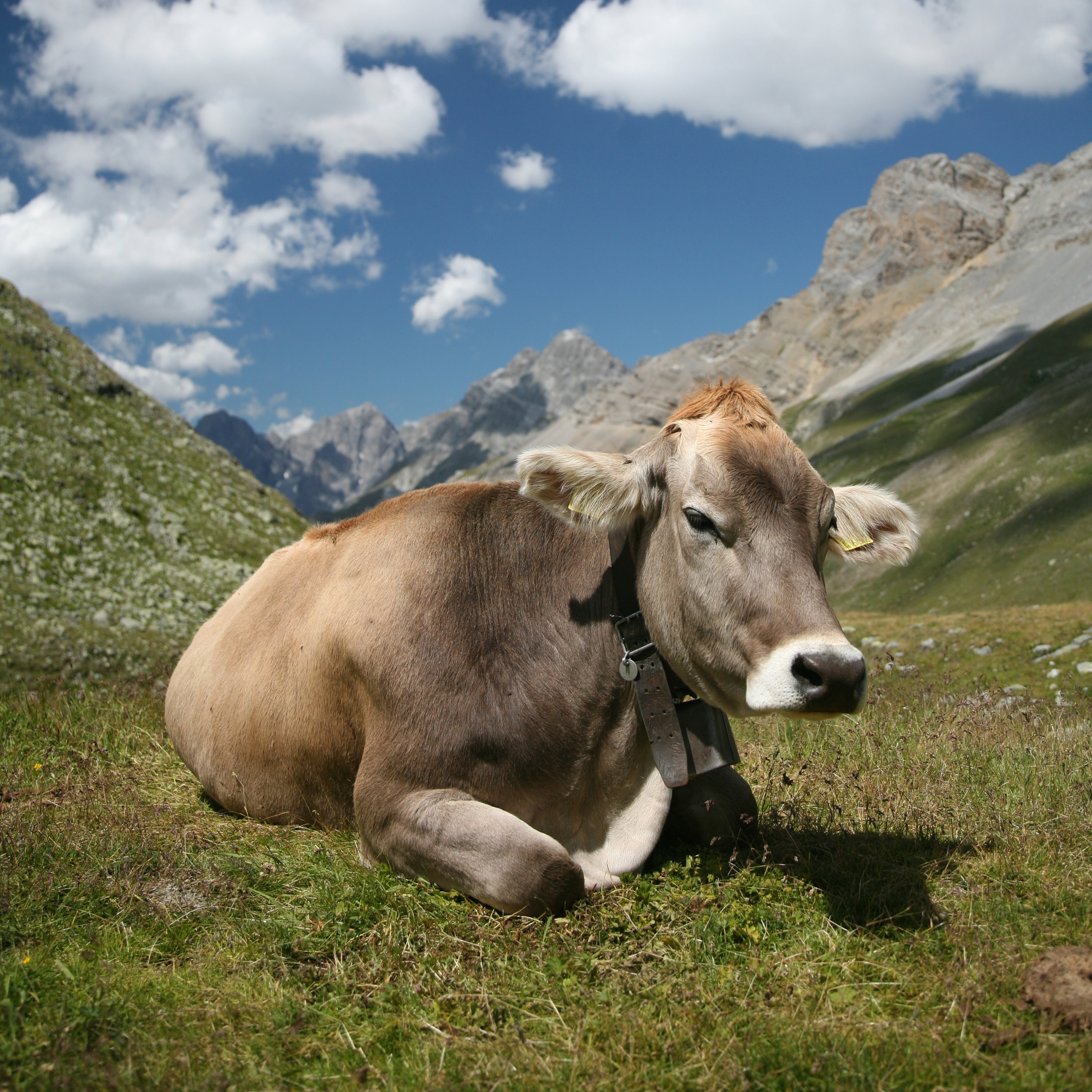
- Cattle (Bos taurus)

Scientific classification
- Kingdom: Animalia
- Phylum: Chordata
- Class: Mammalia
- Order: Artiodactyla
- Family: Bovidae
- Subfamily: Bovinae
- Subtribe: Bovina
- Genus: Bos; Linnaeus, 1758

Type species
- Bos taurus Linnaeus, 1758

Species
- See § taxonomy

Audio
- Bos taurus call

= Bos =

Bos Temporal range: Middle Pleistocene–recent

Genus of wild and domestic cattle

Bos (from Latin bōs: cow, ox, bull) is a genus of bovines, which includes, among others, wild and domestic cattle.

Bos is often divided into four subgenera: Bos, Bibos, Novibos, and Poephagus, but including these last three divisions within the genus Bos without including Bison is believed to be paraphyletic by many workers on the classification of the genus since the 1980s. The genus as traditionally defined has five extant species, but this rises to eight when the domesticated varieties are counted as separate species, and ten when the closely related Bison is also included. Most but not all modern breeds of domesticated cattle (including taurine cattle and zebu) are believed to have originated from the extinct aurochs. Others like Bali cattle and gayal are thought to have originated from South and Southeast Asian Bos species.

== Description ==
The species are grazers, with large teeth to break up the plant material they ingest. They are ruminants, having a four-chambered stomach that allows them to break down plant material.

== Distribution ==
There are about 1.3 billion domestic cattle alive today, making them one of the world's most numerous mammals. Members of this genus are currently found in Africa, Asia, Europe, parts of North America, South America and also in Oceania. Their habitats vary greatly depending on the particular species; they can be found in prairies, rain forests, wetlands, savannah and temperate forests.

== Ecology ==
Most Bos species have a lifespan of 18–25 years in the wild, with up to 36 being recorded in captivity. They have a 9–11 month gestation, depending on the species and birth one or, rarely, two young in the spring.

Most species travel in small herds ranging in size from ten to thirty members. Within most herds, there is one bull (male) for all the cows (female). Dominance is important in the herds; calves will usually inherit their mother's position in the hierarchy.

They are generally diurnal, resting in the hot part of the day and being active morning and afternoon. In areas where humans have encroached on the territory of a herd, they may turn nocturnal. Some species are also migratory, moving with food and water availability.

== Taxonomy ==
In 2003, the International Commission on Zoological Nomenclature resolved a long-standing dispute about the naming of those species (or pairs of species) of Bos that contain both wild and domesticated forms. The commission "conserved the usage of 17 specific names based on wild species, which are predated by or contemporary with those based on domestic forms", confirming Bos primigenius for the aurochs and Bos gaurus for the gaur. If domesticated cattle and gayal are considered separate species, they are to be named Bos taurus and Bos frontalis; however, if they are considered part of the same species as their wild relatives, the common species are to be named Bos primigenius and Bos gaurus.

During the 2010s, analysis of the complex genetics of the bovine lineages determined that the genus Bison needed to be relegated to a subgenus of Bos in order to retain monophyly within Bos since both extant species of Bison are phylogenetically embedded within Bos. The specific relationships in these analyses determined that the two living bison species were each other's closest living relatives, with their closest relatives amongst Bos being the yaks based on nuclear DNA. The mitochondrial DNA for the wisent was found to contradict the nuclear DNA result, and was more closely related to those of cattle, while the mitochondrial DNA of the American bison supported the nuclear DNA result of a close relationship with yaks. The discrepancy between the mitochondrial DNA of the American bison and wisent is suggested to be likely due to incomplete lineage sorting or genetic introgression into B. bonasus from other Bos species.

Relationships of members of the genus Bos based on nuclear genomes after Sinding, et al. 2021.

- Bos
  - Bos primigenius + Bos taurus (aurochs and cattle)
  - - - Bos mutus (wild yak)
      - - Bison bison (American bison)
        - Bison bonasus (European bison/wisent)
    - - Bos javanicus (banteng)
      - Bos gaurus (gaur)
      - Bos sauveli (kouprey)

=== Species ===
The following species are known:

- Subgenus Bos Linnaeus, 1758
  - Bos taurus (domestic cattle)
    - B. t. taurus (Taurine cattle)
    - B. t. africanus (Sanga cattle)
  - Bos indicus (zebu or indicine cattle)
  - †Bos primigenius (aurochs)
    - †B. p. primigenius (Eurasian aurochs)
    - †B. p. mauritanicus (North African aurochs)
    - †B. p. namadicus (Indian aurochs)
  - †Bos acutifrons
  - †Bos buiaensis
- Subgenus Bibos Hodgson, 1837
  - Bos gaurus (gaur or Indian bison)
  - Bos frontalis (gayal)
  - Bos javanicus (banteng)
    - B. j. domesticus (Bali cattle)
  - †Bos palaesondaicus
  - †Bos sauveli (kouprey) (likely extinct, last seen 1969)
- Subgenus Poephagus Gray, 1843
  - Bos mutus (wild yak)
  - Bos grunniens (domestic yak)
  - †Bos baikalensis
- Subgenus Bison Hamilton Smith, 1827 (cladistically included, traditionally treated as a separate genus)
  - Bos bison (American bison)
    - B. b. bison (plains bison)
    - B. b. athabascae (wood bison)
  - Bos bonasus (wisent or European bison)
    - B. b. bonasus (lowland wisent)
    - †B. b. hungarorum (Carpathian wisent)
    - †B. b. caucasicus (dombay or Caucasian wisent)
  - †Bos priscus (Steppe wisent)
  - †Bos antiquus
  - †Bos hanaizumiensis
  - †Bos latifrons
  - †Bos menneri
  - †Bos occidentalis
  - †Bos schoetensacki
  - †Bos palaeosinensis
  - †Bos sivalensis
  - †Bos georgicus

== See also ==
- Bovine genome
- Sacred bull
