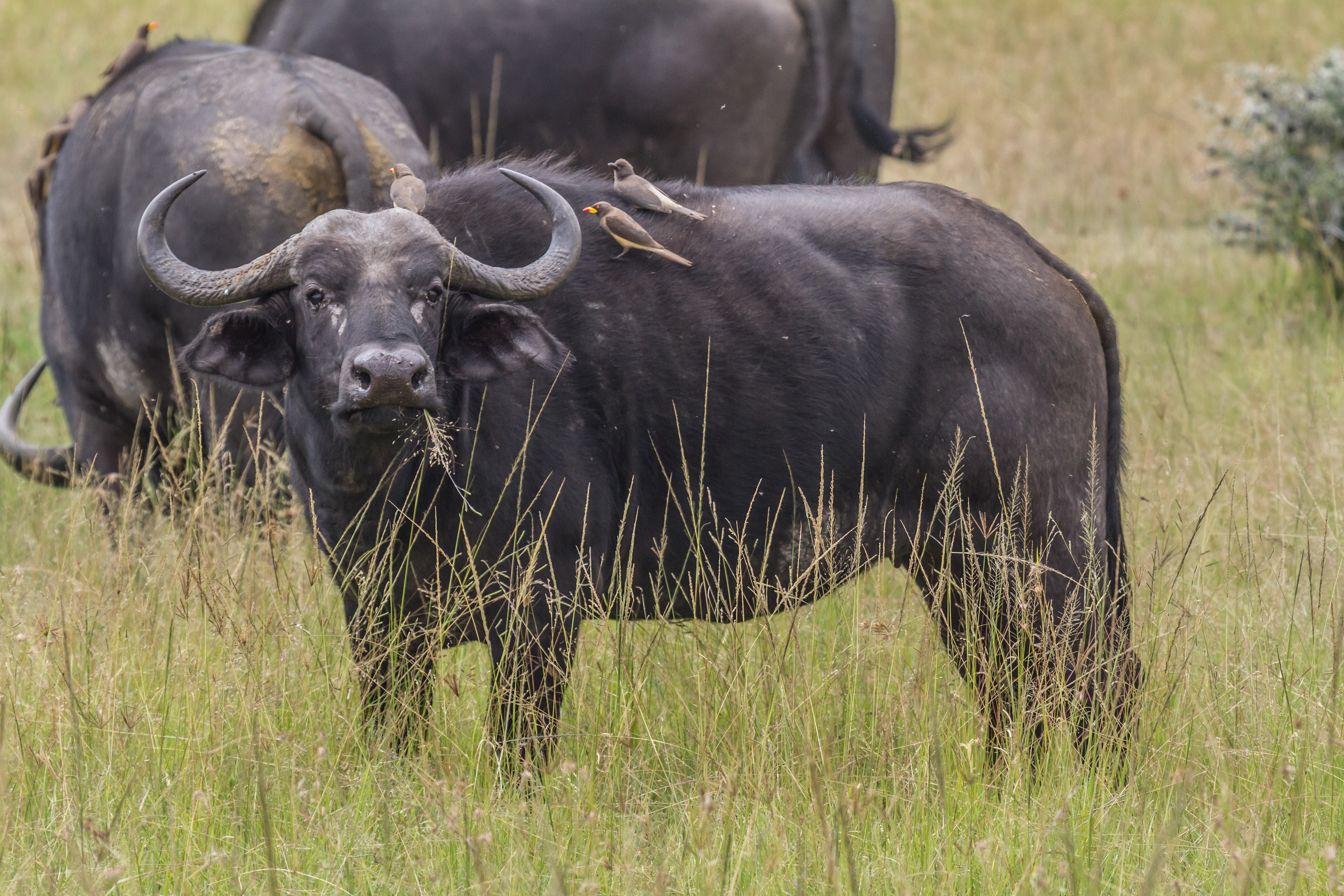
- African buffalo (Syncerus caffer)

Scientific classification
- Kingdom: Animalia
- Phylum: Chordata
- Class: Mammalia
- Order: Artiodactyla
- Family: Bovidae
- Subfamily: Bovinae; J. E. Gray, 1821

Tribes
- Boselaphini Knottnerus-Meyer, 1907; Bovini J. E. Gray, 1821; Tragelaphini Blyth, 1863 sensu Sokolov, 1953

= Bovinae =

Bovines Temporal range: Miocene to present

Subfamily of mammals

Bovines (subfamily Bovinae) comprise a diverse group of 10 genera of medium to large-sized ungulates, including cattle, bison, African buffalo, water buffalos, and the four-horned and spiral-horned antelopes. The members of this group of bovids are classified into loose tribes rather than formal subgroups, as the evolutionary relationships within the groups are still uncertain. General characteristics include cloven hooves and usually at least one of the sexes of a species having true horns. The largest extant bovine is the gaur.

In many countries, bovine milk and meat is used as food by humans. Cattle are kept as livestock almost everywhere except in parts of India and Nepal, where they are considered sacred by most Hindus. Bovines are used as draft animals and as riding animals. Small breeds of domestic bovine, such as the Miniature Zebu, are kept as pets. Bovine leather is durable and flexible and is used to produce a wide range of goods including clothing and bags.

== Systematics and classification ==
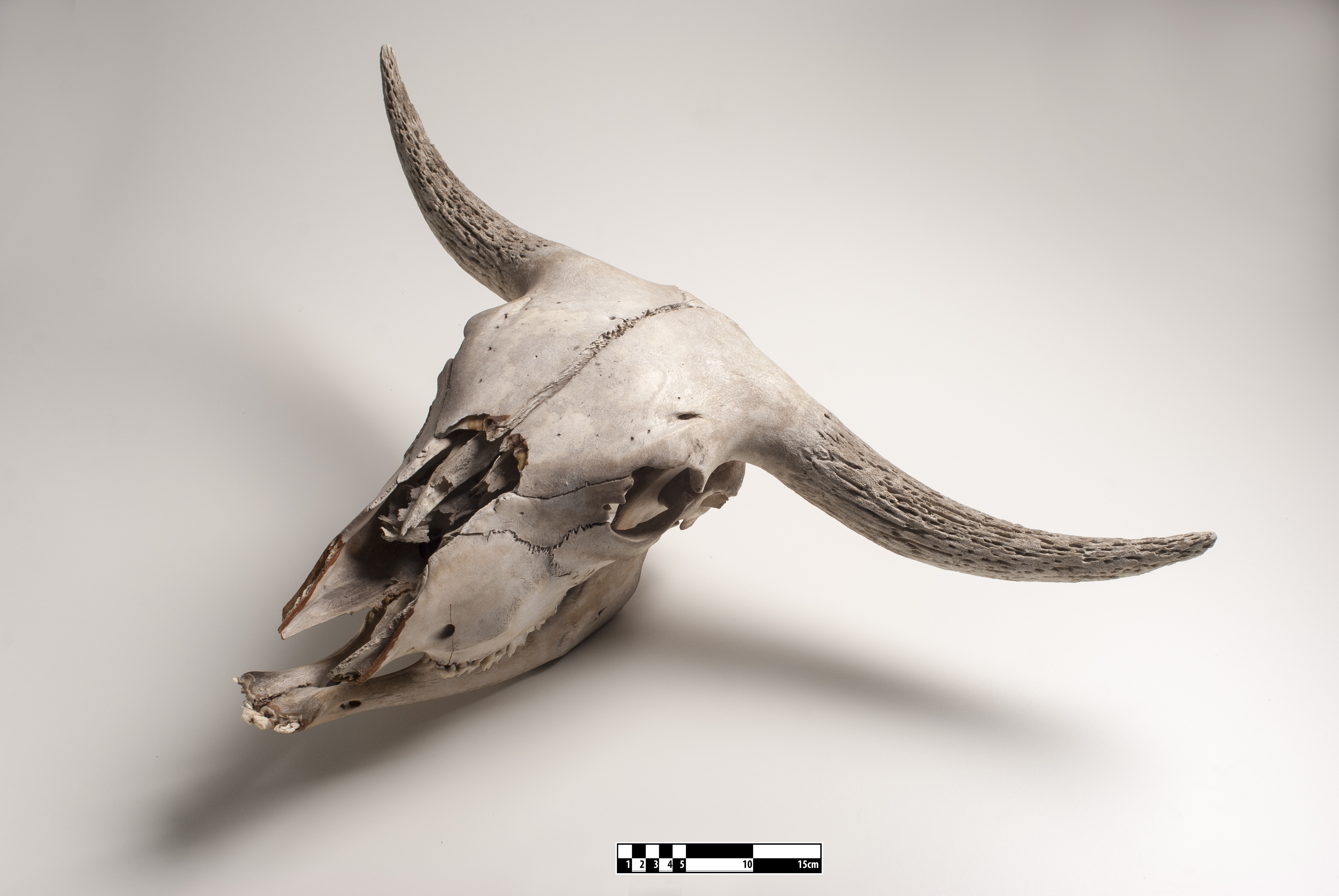
Bovine skull

- Family Bovidae
  - Subfamily Bovinae
    - Genus †Rectacornis?
      - †R. mirabilis
    - Tribe Boselaphini
      - Genus Tetracerus
        - Four-horned antelope, Tetracerus quadricornis
          - T. q. quadricornis
          - T. q. iodes
          - T. q. subquadricornis
      - Genus Boselaphus
        - Nilgai, Boselaphus tragocamelus
          - B. t. tragocamelus (Indian nilgai)
      - Genus †Duboisia
        - †D. santeng
    - Tribe Tragelaphini
      - Genus Tragelaphus (antelope-like)
        - Bongo, Tragelaphus eurycerus
          - T. e. isaaci
          - T. e. eurycerus
        - Greater kudu, Tragelaphus strepsiceros
          - T. s. strepsiceros
          - T. s. chora
          - T. s. cottoni
        - Cape bushbuck, Tragelaphus scriptus
        - Harnessed bushbuck, Tragelaphus sylvaticus
        - Lesser kudu, Tragelaphus imberbis
        - Mountain nyala, Tragelaphus buxtoni
        - Lowland nyala, Tragelaphus angasii
        - Sitatunga, Tragelaphus spekeii
          - T. s. selousi
          - T. s. gratus
          - T. s. spekii
      - Genus Taurotragus
        - Common eland, Taurotragus oryx
          - T. o. oryx
          - T. o. livingstonii
          - T. o. pattersonianus
        - Giant eland, Taurotragus derbianus
          - T. d. derbianus
          - T. d. gigas
    - Tribe Bovini
      - Subtribe Pseudorygina
        - Genus Pseudoryx
          - Saola, Pseudoryx nghetinhensis
      - Subtribe Bubalina
        - Genus Bubalus
          - Wild water buffalo, Bubalus arnee
          - Domestic water buffalo, Bubalus bubalis
          - Lowland anoa, Bubalus depressicornis
          - Mountain anoa, Bubalus quarlesi
          - Tamaraw, Bubalus mindorensis
          - †Cebu tamaraw, Bubalus cebuensis
        - Genus Syncerus
          - African buffalo, Syncerus caffer
            - Cape buffalo, S. c. caffer
            - Nile buffalo, S. c. aequinoctialis
            - Sudan buffalo, S. c. brachyceros
            - Forest buffalo, S. c. nanus
          - †Giant buffalo, Syncerus antiquus
      - Subtribe Bovina
        - Genus Bos
          - Aurochs, Bos primigenius
            - †Eurasian aurochs, B. p. primigenius
            - †Indian aurochs, B. p. namadicus
          - Banteng, Bos javanicus
          - Domestic banteng, Bos domesticus
          - Gaur, Bos gaurus
          - Gayal, Bos frontalis
          - Domestic yak, Bos grunniens
          - Wild yak, Bos mutus
          - †Bos palaesondaicus
          - Kouprey, Bos sauveli (possibly extinct)
          - Zebu cattle, Bos indicus
          - Domestic cattle, Bos taurus
            - Taurine cattle, B. t. taurus
            - Sanga cattle, B. t. africanus
        - Genus Bison
          - American bison, Bison bison
            - Wood bison, B. b. athabascae
            - Plains bison, B. b. bison
          - European bison, Bison bonasus
          - †Bison palaeosinensis
          - †Steppe wisent, Bison priscus
          - †Ancient bison, Bison antiquus
          - †Long-horned bison, Bison latifrons
      - Genus †Pelorovis
        - †Pelorovis oldowayensis
        - †Pelorovis turkanensis
        - †Pelorovis howelli
        - ?†Pelorovis praeafricanus

== Etymology ==
Bovine is derived from Latin bos, "ox", through Late Latin bovinus. Bos comes from the Indo-European root *g^{w}ous, meaning ox.

== See also ==
- Dairy cattle
