= Mececyon =

Mececyon Temporal range: Pleistocene

Scientific classification
- Domain: Eukaryota
- Kingdom: Animalia
- Phylum: Chordata
- Class: Mammalia
- Order: Carnivora
- Family: Canidae
- Genus: †Mececyon
- Species: †M. trinilensis

Binomial name
- †Mececyon trinilensis Stremme, 1911

Extinct species of carnivore

Mececyon trinilensis, the Trinil dog, is an extinct canid species that lived on the island of Java in Indonesia during the Pleistocene.

== Description ==
The body size of Mececyon trinilensis been estimated at around 6.8–17.1 kilograms (15–38 lb), comparable to a dhole. This small size is the result of insular dwarfism.

== Habitat and ecology ==
Mececyon trinilensis is endemic to the island of Java. It was part of the Pleistocene Trinil Fauna of Java, which dates to the late Early-Middle Pleistocene. Other animals of this Faunal assemblage were Bos palaesondaicus, the Indian muntjak (Muntiacus muntjak), Bubalus paleaeokerabau, the Dubois santeng and Stegodon trigonocephalus. Other predators of the Trinil Fauna were the Trinil tiger (Panthera tigris trinilensis) and the leopard cat (Prionailurus bengalensis).

Mececyon is suggested to have been a hypercarnivore. It has been estimated that Mececyon trinilensis hunted prey of 1 kg to 10 kg, preferably 5 kg in size. However this number could vary, because it is yet unknown if the Mececyon trinilensis hunted in packs, or if carrion left over by the Trinil tiger influenced its feeding habits. Likely prey included rats and birds.

== Evolution ==
Mececyon trinilensis probably ultimately originated from the mainland Xenocyon, perhaps Xenocyon lycanoides, likely via the intermediate species Megacyon merriami, which is proportionally larger than mainland Xenocyon species, and known from older Early Pleistocene fossils on Java. The similarly dwarfed Sardinian dhole (Cynotherium sardous) is also suggested to have evolved from Xenocyon. Its closest living relatives are the African wild dog (Lycaon pictus) and the dhole (Cuon alpinus). Some authors have suggested sinking Mececyon and Megacyon into Xenocyon.

During the early Middle Pleistocene, the extinct dhole species Cuon priscus arrived on Java. It has been suggested that C. priscus outcompeted M/X. trinilensis, resulting in its absence in younger deposits.
