= Hemimachairodus =

Hemimachairodus Temporal range: Pleistocene

Scientific classification
- Kingdom: Animalia
- Phylum: Chordata
- Class: Mammalia
- Order: Carnivora
- Family: Felidae
- Subfamily: †Machairodontinae
- Genus: †Hemimachairodus; Koenigswald, 1974

Type species
- Hemimachairodus zwierzyckii (von Koenigswald, 1934)

Synonyms
- Epimachairodus zwierzyckii von Koenigswald, 1934; Homotherium zwierzyckii sensu Kurtén, 1962

Extinct genus of carnivores

Hemimachairodus is an extinct genus of machairodontine (sabre-toothed) cat with only one species, Hemimachairodus zwierzyckii, known from only a few fossils from the Pleistocene of Java. Other fossils attributed to Hemimachairodus sp. are known from the Villafranchian (late Pliocene to early Pleistocene) of Tajikistan.

Recent studies have suggested that it is a junior synonym of Homotherium.

== Discovery and naming ==
The species was originally described in 1934 by German palaeontologist Gustav Heinrich Ralph von Koenigswald under the name Epimachairodus zwierzyckii. He referred to it again by that name in 1940. A 1962 paper by Bjorn Kurtén referred to it as Homotherium zwierzyckii, stating that its homotheriine affinities were unmistakable, although he allowed it might also belong to the homotheriine genus Dinobastis instead.

In 1974, Koenigswald described more fossils that he assigned to the species, and referred it to a new genus Hemimachairodus. No etymology for the genus name was given. He assigned Hemimachairodus to the subfamily Machairodontinae.

In 1988, Soviet paleontologists described fossils from the Villafranchian-aged Kuruksay (Lagernaja) locality in Tajikistan that they assigned to Hemimachairodus sp. Further study of Plio-Pleistocene carnivorans touched on its presence in 1989, and Scharapov included a section on Hemimachairodus in his 1996 review of machairodontine fossils from the Tajikistan.

=== Etymology ===
The specific epithet was given in honor of the Polish geologist Józef Zwierzycki. The genus name seems to be a combination of the Greek ἡμι/hēmi meaning "half", and Machairodus.

== Description ==
Koenigswald's 1974 diagnosis of Hemimachairodus noted the complete reduction of the third premolar, and serrations on the upper canine teeth being limited to the inner edge. Scharapov's 1996 review noted that Hemimachairodus was similar to Homotherium in size and proportions, and only differed by the absence of the third premolar and the notching on inner side of the upper canine.

The holotype of Hemimachairodus zwierzyckii is a partial left mandibular ramus, retaining the first incisor, the canine, and the fourth premolar, after which it is broken. Koenigswald in 1974 described it as having a weak mental process and a strongly developed mental crest. The mandible itself is slender, with a 46mm diastemata. It was recovered from Sangiran in central Java.

From Sangiran, Koenigswald (1974) also described a second partial jaw fossil, broken about 1cm behind the molar and 2cm in front of the premolar and retaining both teeth; one tip and one complete lower canine; and two fragments of an upper canine tooth. And from the Djetis Beds Modjokerto in eastern Java, a fragment of a mandible retaining a premolar and the front half of a molar. H. zwierzyckii was estimated by one study to have weighed about 130 kilograms (290 lb).

== Palaeoenvironment ==
=== Java ===
The Sangiran Dome locality in Java, Indonesia from which von Koenigswald collected the fossils spans over a million years, and he did not record the stratigraphic backgrounds of his finds. Volmer et al. in 2016 estimated that von Koenigswald's machairodontine fossils came from the Ci Saat or Kedung Brubus faunal units, or possibly the Trinil H.K. faunal unit between them, which collectively date to the Early to Middle Pleistocene; a previous paper in 2001 had placed Hemimachairodus in the Trinil H.K. faunal unit. Other large carnivorans from the same deposits the tiger, fellow machairodontine Homotherium latidens, and the canid Megacyon merriami, all which H. zwierzyckii likely competed with for prey, and the intense competition may have led to its extinction. Other mammals known from the Sangiran locality include rodents, wild pigs, tapirs, muntjacs, deer, rhinoceros, the antelope Duboisia santeng, and the proboscidean Stegodon trigonocephalus.

=== Tajikistan ===
The Kuruksaj locality, meanwhile, is estimated to be 2.4-2.4 million years of age (late Pliocene, European Land Mammal Unit MN17). Fossils of both forest and plains-dwelling mammals have been found there, including leporines, the rodents Hystrix and Promimomys, the monkey Paradolichopithecus, canids Nyctereutes megamastoides and Canis kuruksaensis, hyaenas Chasmaporthetes and Pachycrocuta, an indeterminate hyena, two different proboscideans, the rhinoceratid Dicerorhinus, the horse Equus stenonis, the camelid Paracamelus, giraffids Sogdianotherium and Sivatherium, and several species each of cervids (deer) and bovids.
