= Southern Thailand =

Region in Thailand

Coordinates: 8.0592°N 99.9756°E

Southern Region Phak Tai (ภาคใต้), Paktai (ปักษ์ใต้)
- Region
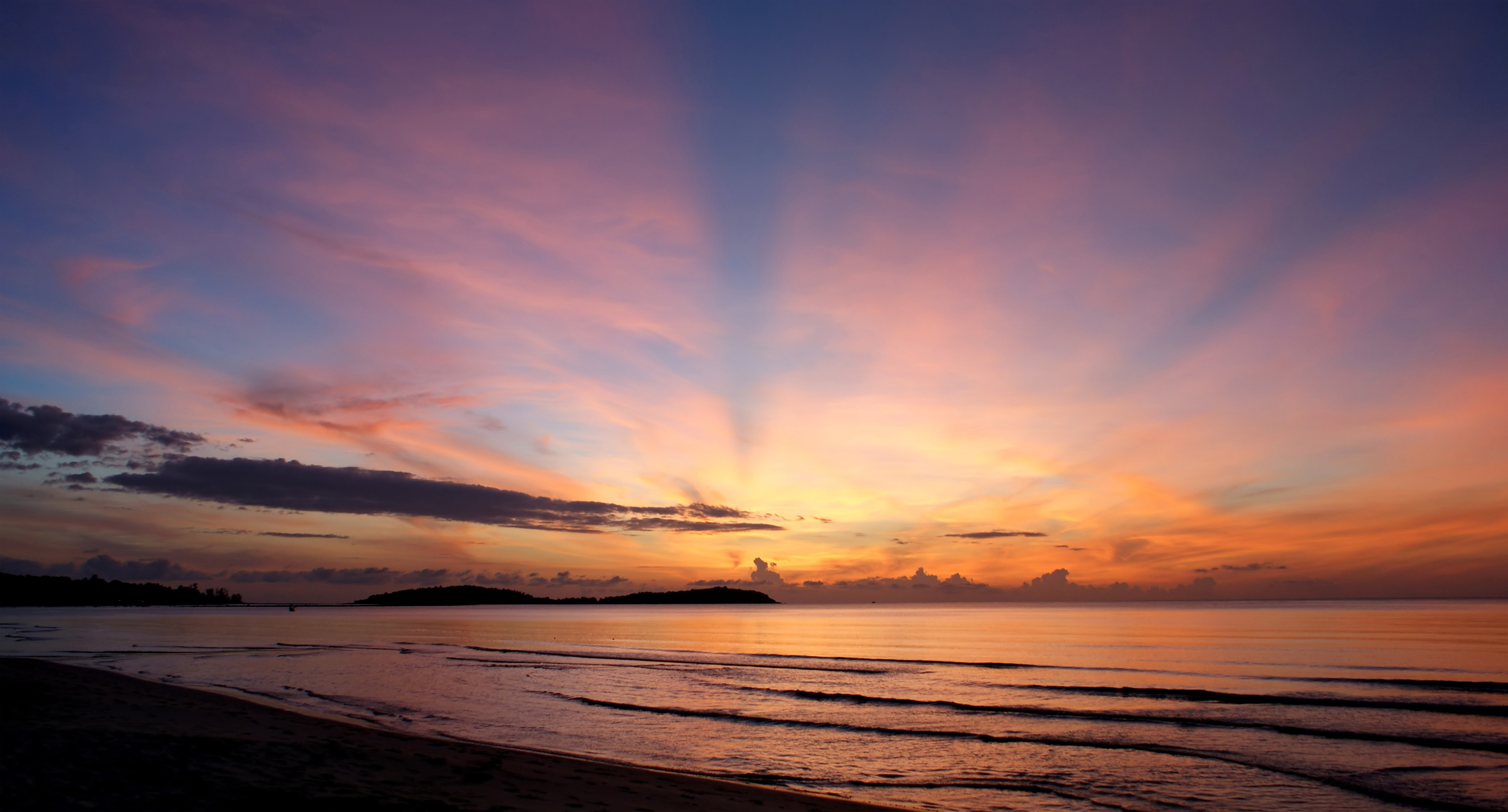
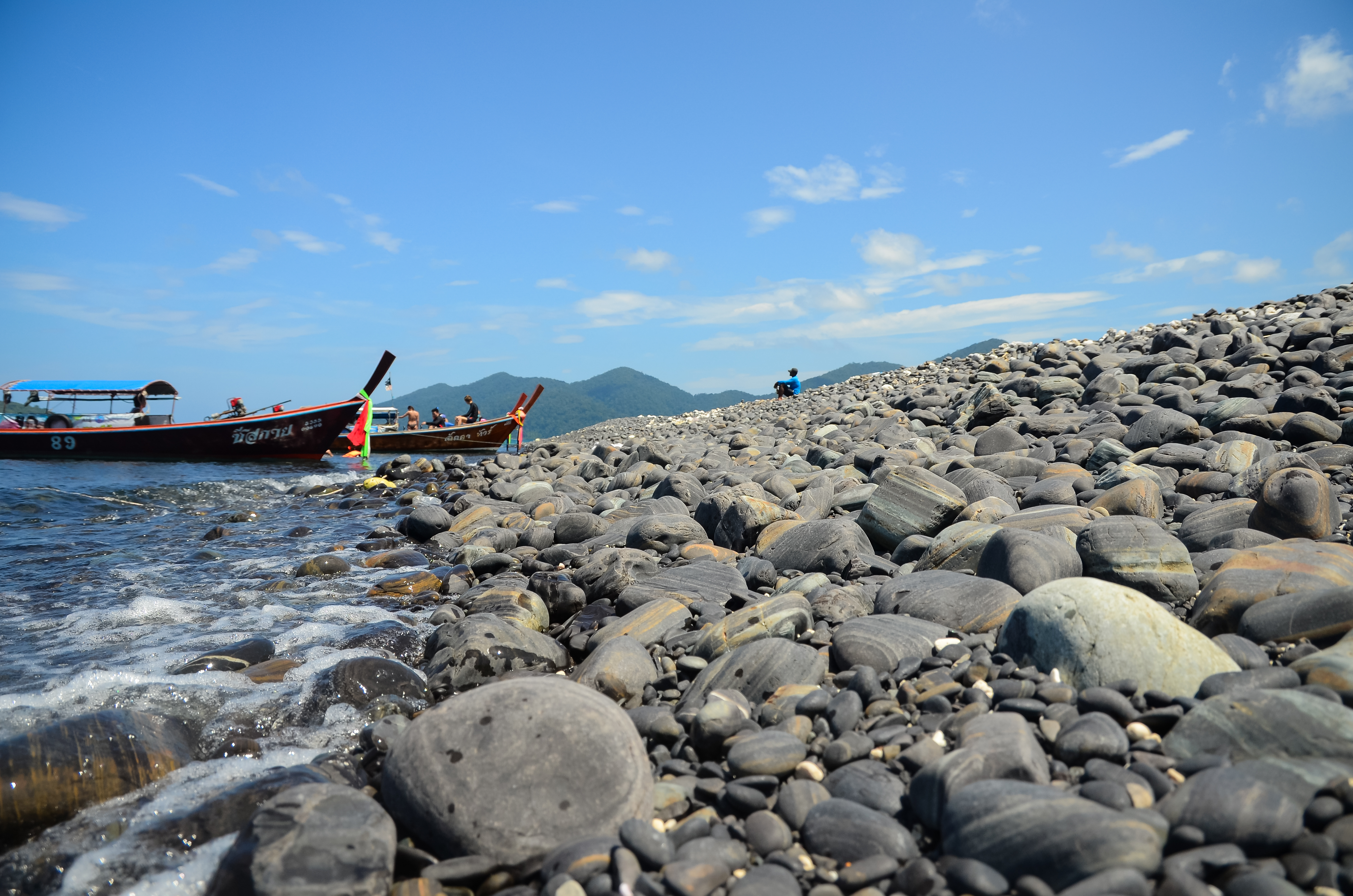
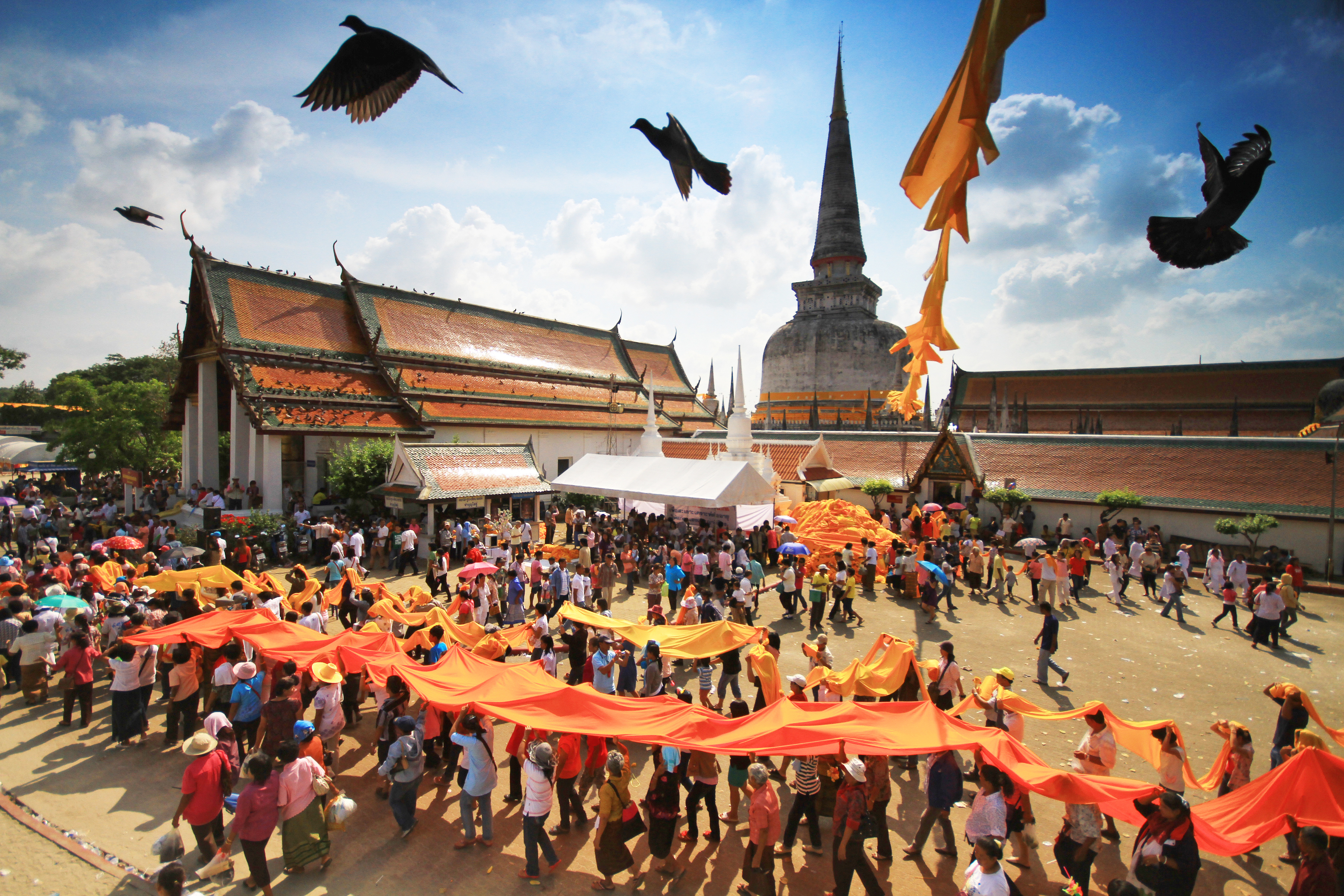
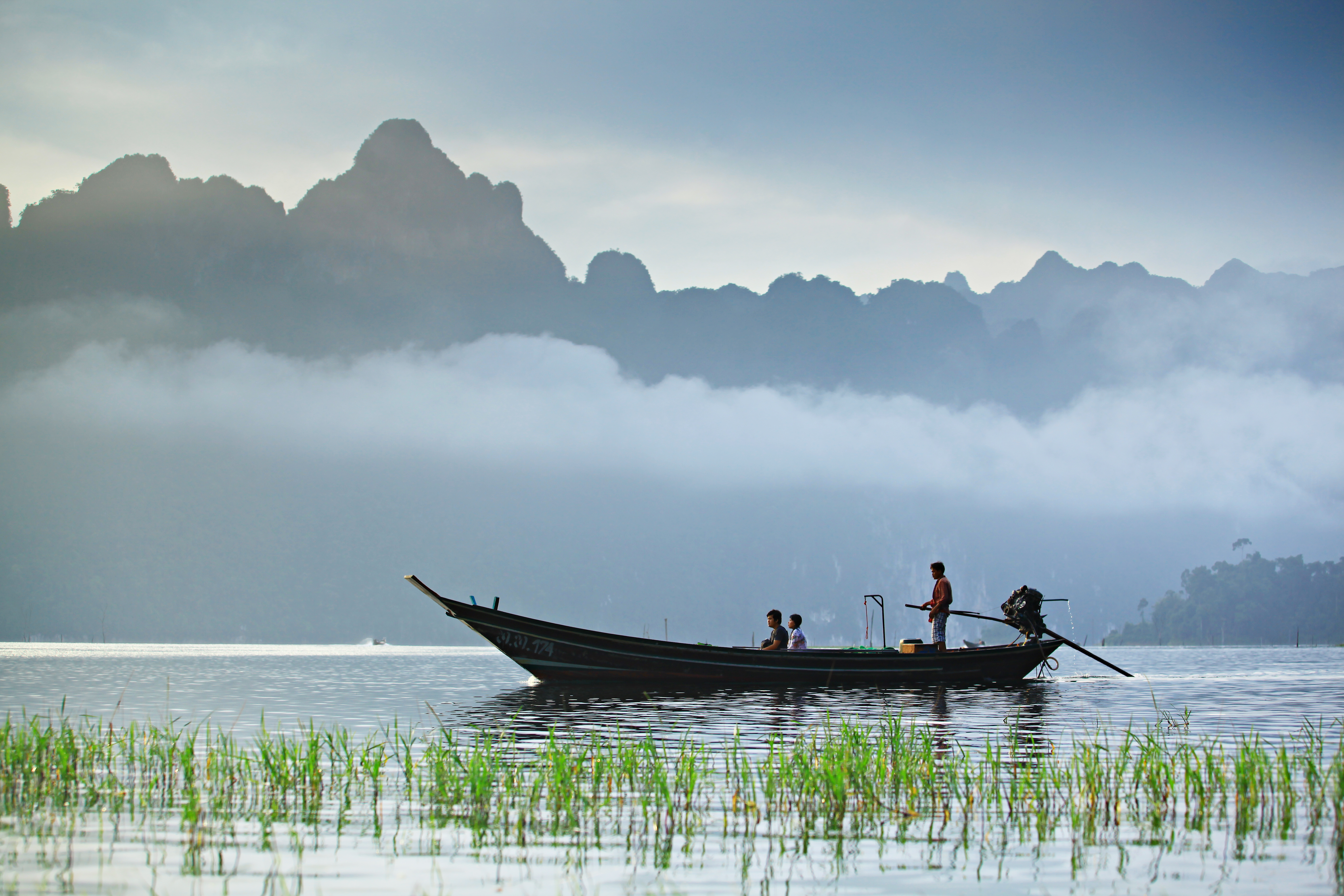
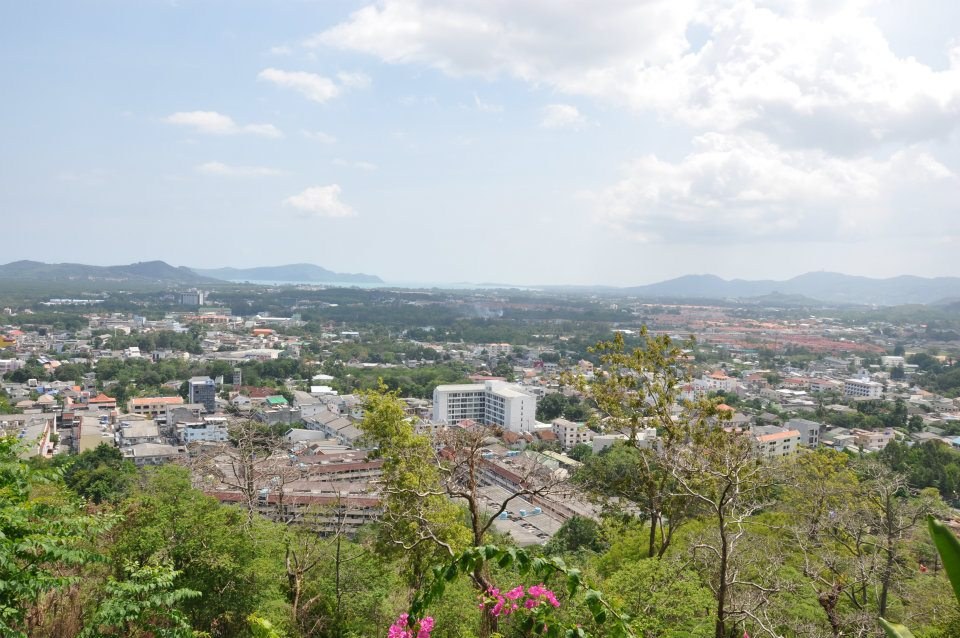
- From upper-left to lower-right: Sunrise Thailand Ko Samui, Tarutao National Park, Wat Phra Mahathat Woramahawihan, Rajjaprabha Dam and Phuket City.

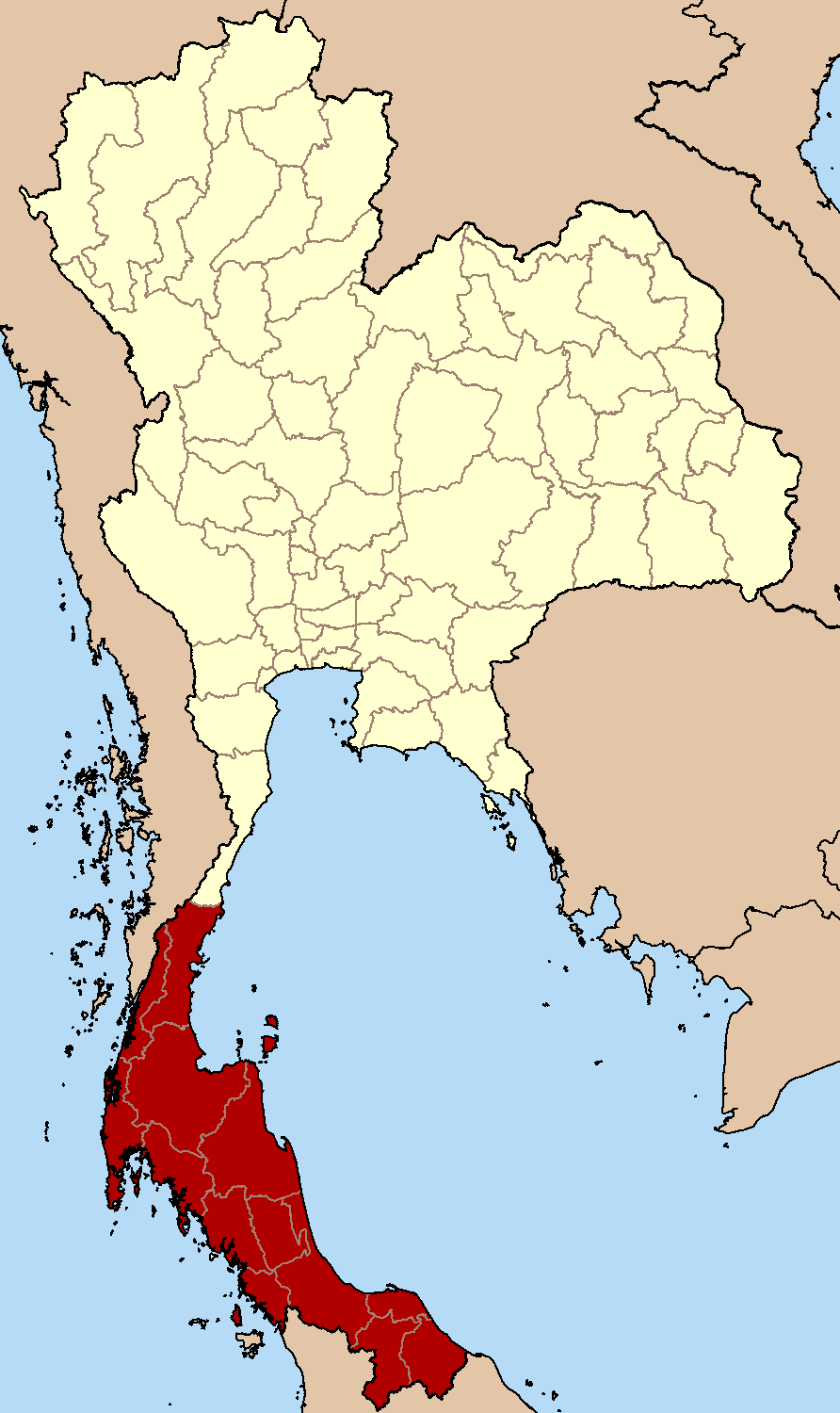
- Southern Region in Thailand
- Largest city: Hat Yai
- Provinces: 14 Provinces: Chumphon Province; Krabi Province; Nakhon Si Thammarat Province; Narathiwat Province; Pattani Province; Phang Nga Province; Phatthalung Province; Phuket Province; Ranong Province; Satun Province; Songkhla Province; Surat Thani Province; Trang Province; Yala Province

Area
  - Total: 73,848 km^{2} (28,513 sq mi)

Population (2018)
  - Total: 9,454,193
  - Density: 134/km^{2} (350/sq mi)
- Demonym(s): Khon Tai, Khon Peranakan, Khon Chin

GDP (Nominal, 2024)
  - Metro: ฿1.672 trillion (US$47.785 billion)
  - Per capita: ฿170,018 (US$4,829)
- Time zone: UTC+07:00 (ICT)
- Language: Southern Thai • Pattani Malay • Satun Malay • Mos • Urak Lawoi' • Moklen • Hokkien etc.

Southern Thailand (formerly Southern Siam and Tambralinga) is the southernmost cultural region of Thailand, separated from Central Thailand by the Kra Isthmus.

== Geography ==
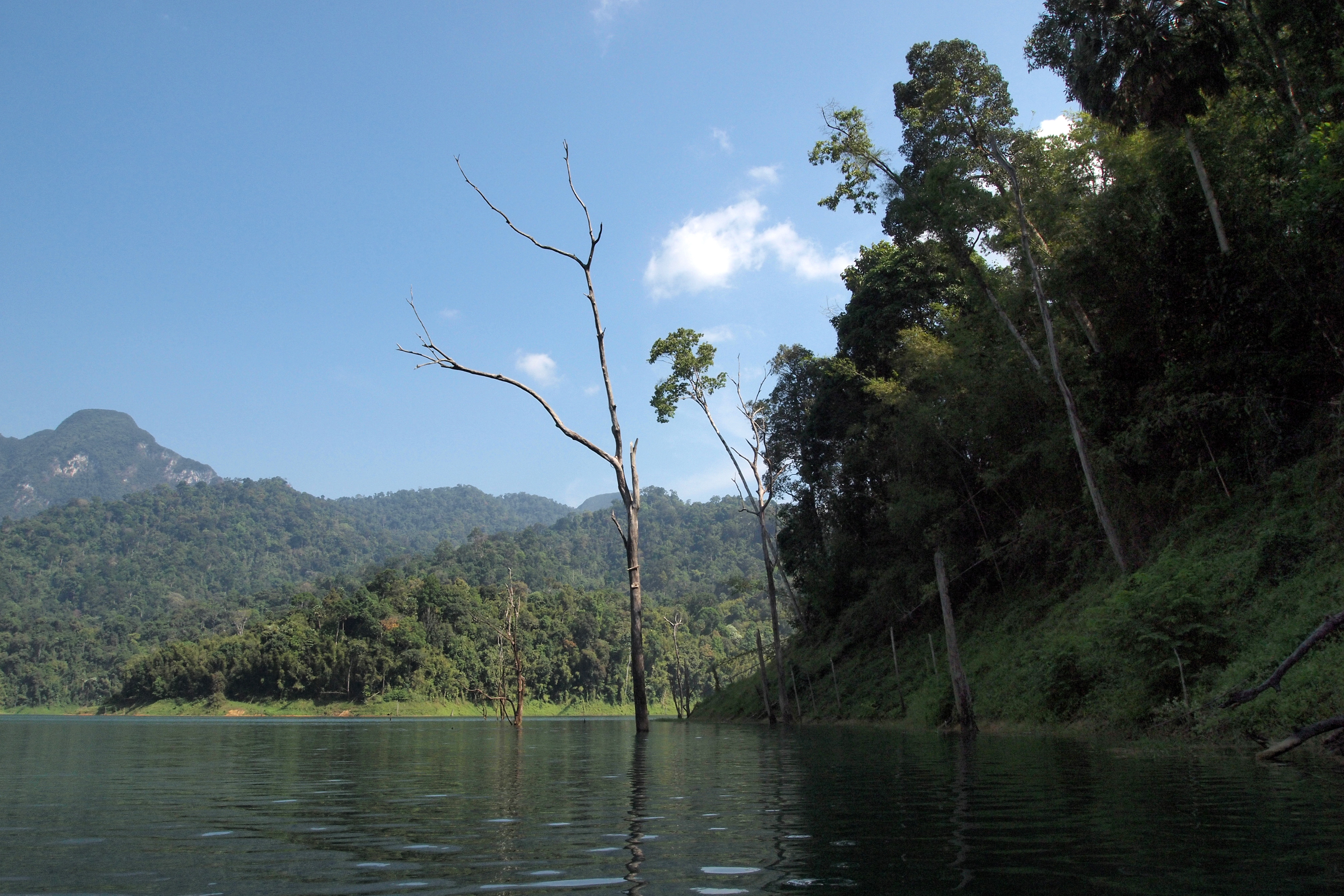
Khao Sok National Park, Surat Thani

Southern Thailand is on the Malay Peninsula, with an area of around 70,714 km^{2} (27,303 sq mi), bounded to the north by Kra Isthmus, the narrowest part of the peninsula. The western part has highly steep coasts, while on the east side river plains dominate. The largest river in the south is the Tapi, in Surat Thani, which, together with the Phum Duang in Surat Thani, drains more than 8,000 km^{2} (3,100 sq mi), more than 10 percent of the total area of southern Thailand. Smaller rivers include the Pattani, Saiburi, Krabi, and the Trang. The largest lake in the south is Songkhla Lake (1,040 km^{2} (400 sq mi) altogether). The largest artificial lake is the Chiao Lan (Ratchaprapha Dam), occupying 165 km^{2} (64 sq mi) of Khao Sok National Park in Surat Thani. The total forest area is 17,964 km^{2} (6,936 sq mi) or 24.3 percent of provincial area.

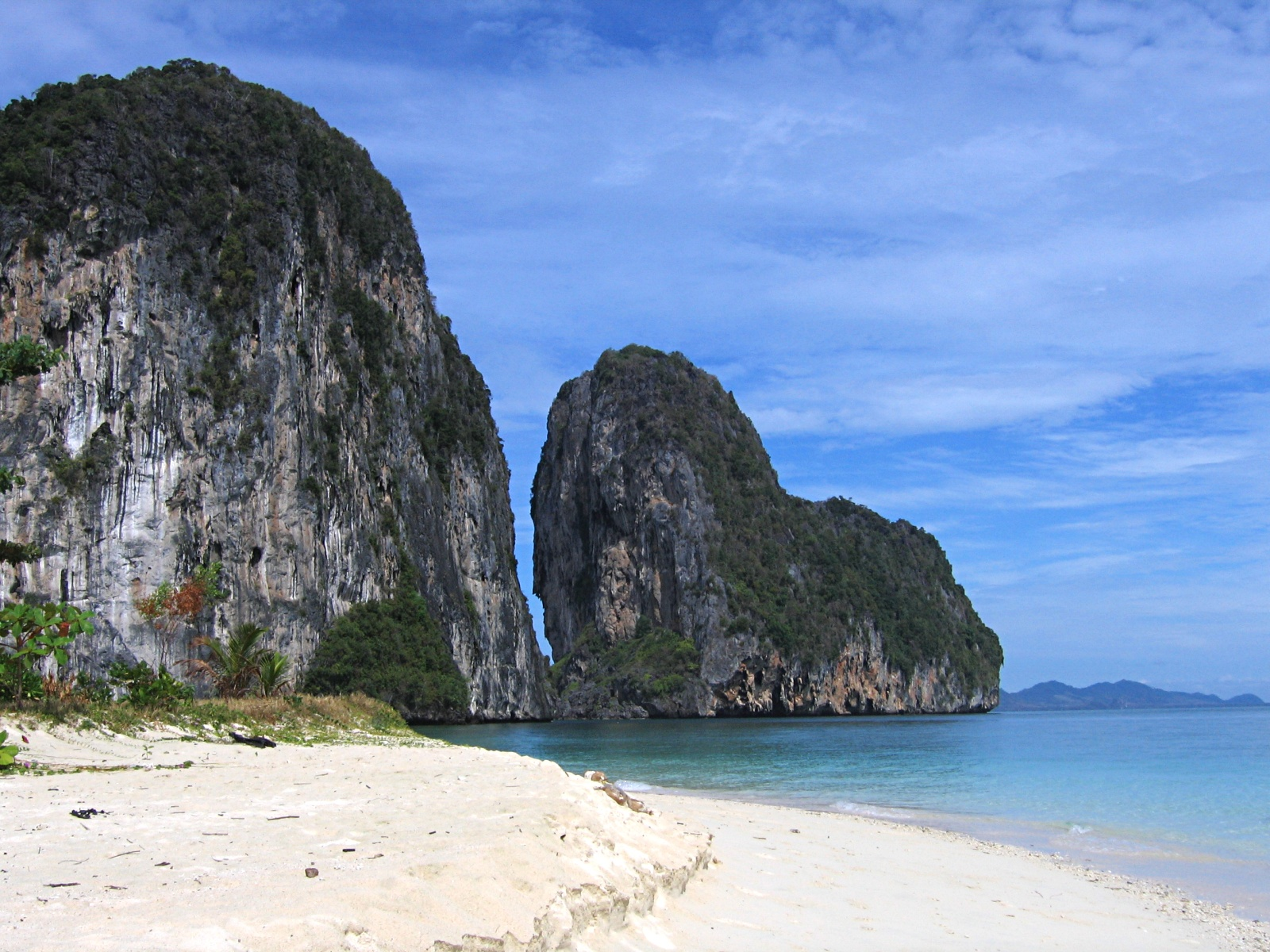
Ko Lao Liang Phi

Running through the middle of the peninsula are several mountain chains, with the highest elevation at Khao Luang, 1,835 m (6,020 ft), in Nakhon Si Thammarat province. Ranging from the Kra Isthmus to Phuket Island is the Phuket chain, which connects to the Tanao Si Mountain Range further north. Almost parallel to the Phuket chain but 100 km (60 mi) to the east is the Nakhon Si Thammarat, or Banthat, chain, which begins with Samui Island, Ko Pha-ngan, and Ko Tao in Surat Thani Province and ends at the Malaysian border at the Ko Ta Ru Tao archipelago. The border with Malaysia is formed by the Sankalakhiri range, sometimes sub-divided into the Pattani, Taluban, and Songkhla chain. At the Malaysian border, the Titiwangsa chain rises.

The limestone of the west coast has been eroded into many steep singular hills. The parts submerged by the rising sea after the Last Ice Age now form many islands, like the well-known Phi Phi Islands. Also well known is the so-called James Bond Island in Phang Nga Bay, featured in the movie The Man with the Golden Gun.

The population of the growing region is projected to be 9,156,000 in 2015, up from 8,871,003 in 2010 (census count and adjusted). Although those figures are adjusted for citizens who have left for Bangkok or who moved to the region from elsewhere, as well as registered permanent residents (residency was problematic in the prior 2000 census), the figure is still misleading. There are still a huge number of migrant or informal workers, temporary workers and even stateless people and a large expatriate population, which are not included.

Most of southern Thailand is in Tenasserim–South Thailand semi-evergreen rain forests ecoregion. The Peninsular Malaysian rain forests and Peninsular Malaysian montane rain forests ecoregions extend into southernmost Thailand along the border with Malaysia.

== History ==
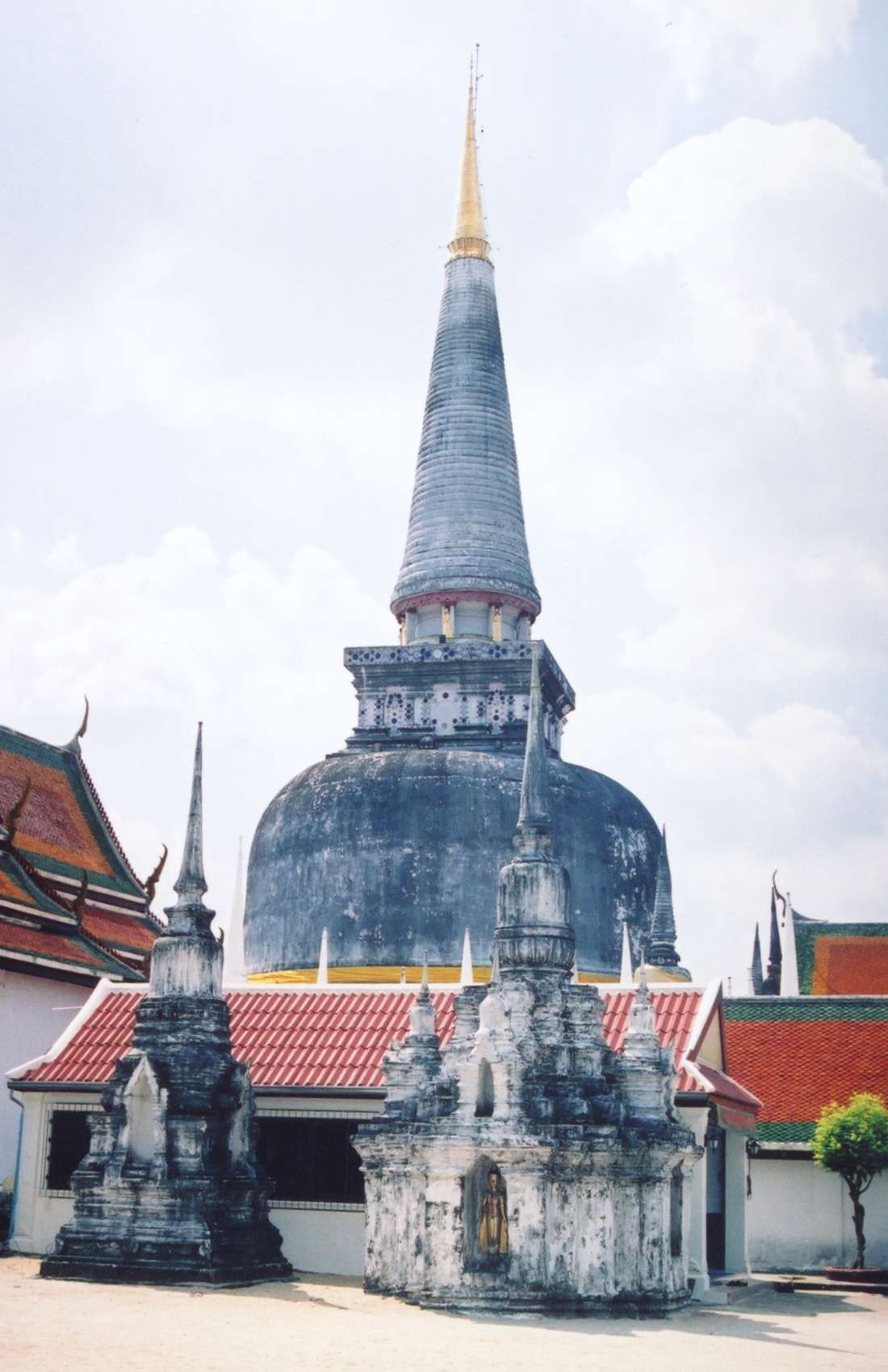
Wat Phra Baromathat, Nakhon Si Thammarat, an old and important temple

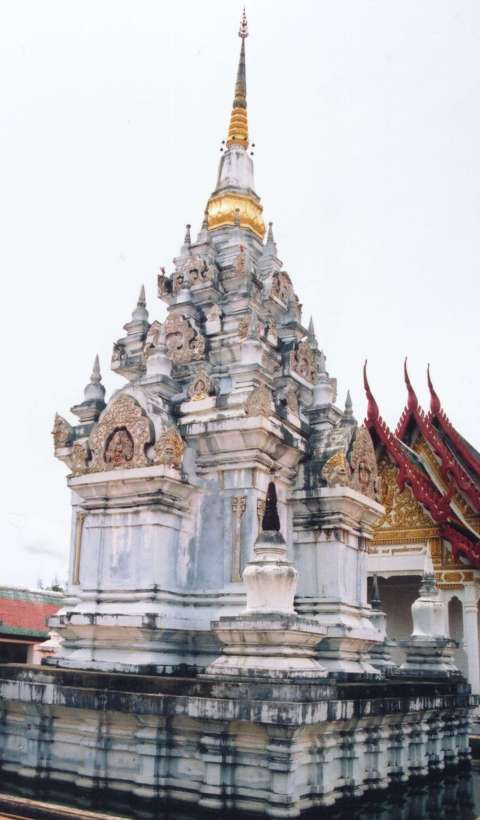
Pagoda in Javanese or Sailendran-style, Chaiya, Surat Thani

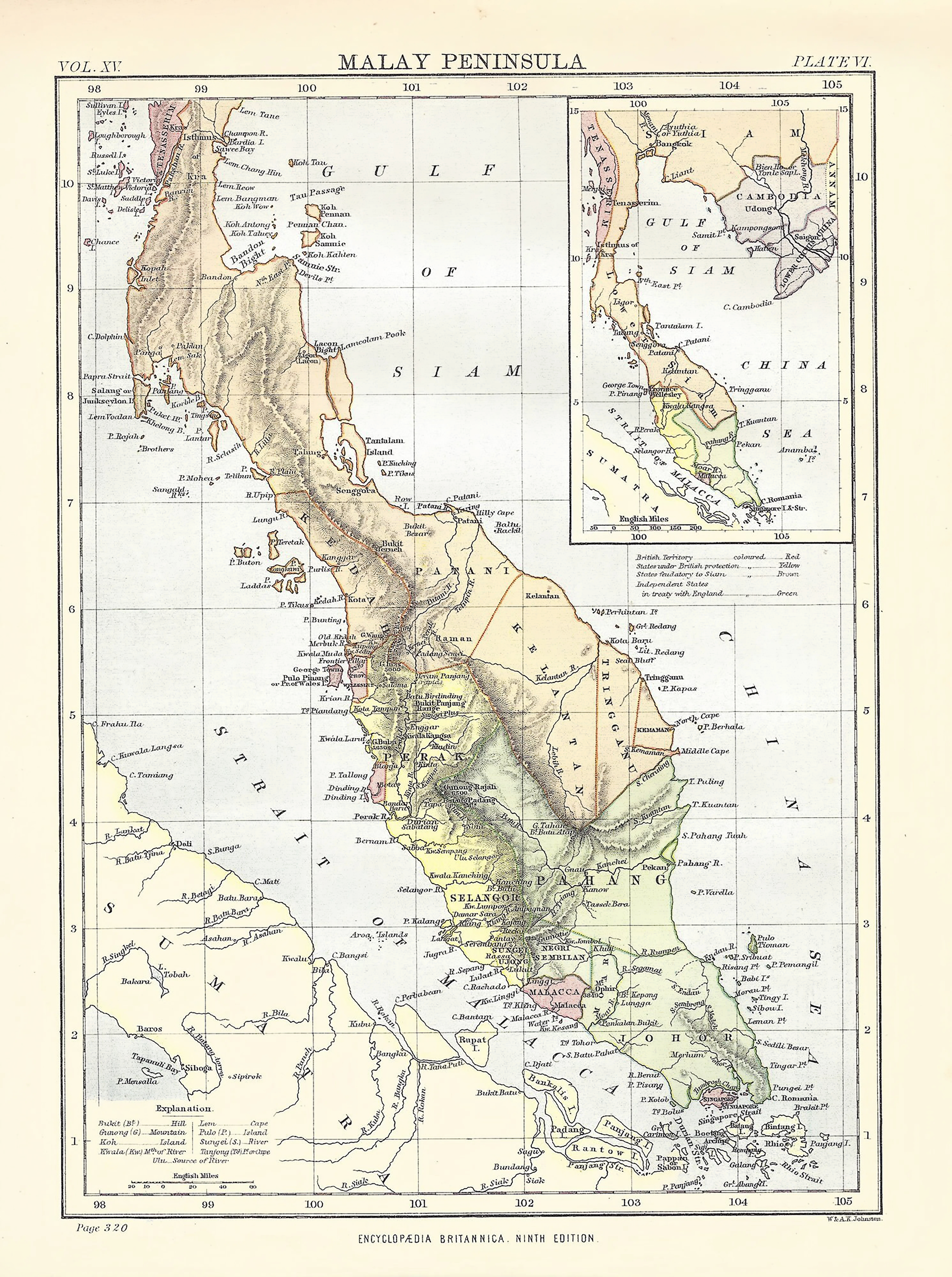
Malay Peninsula map with British and Siam territories 1889

The Malay Peninsula has been settled since prehistoric times. Archeological remains were found in several caves, some used for dwellings, others as burial sites. The oldest remains were found in Lang Rongrien Cave, dating 38,000 to 27,000 years before present, and in the contemporary Moh Khiew cave.

In the first millennium, Chinese chronicles mention several coastal cities or city-states. No exact geographical locations were recorded and so the identification of these cities with later settlements is difficult. The most important of those states were Langkasuka, usually considered a precursor of the Patani Kingdom; Tambralinga, probably the precursor of the Nakhon Si Thammarat Kingdom, or P'an-p'an in Phunphin district, Surat Thani, probably located at the Bandon Bay Tapi River. The cities were highly influenced by Indian culture, and have adopted Brahman or Buddhist religion. When Srivijaya in Chaiya extended its sphere of influence, those cities became tributary states of Srivijaya. The city Chaiya in Surat Thani Province contains several ruins from Srivijaya times, and was probably a regional capital of the kingdom. Some Thai historians even claim that it was the capital of the kingdom itself for some time, but this is disputed.

After Srivijaya lost its influence, Nakhon Si Thammarat became the dominant kingdom of the area. During the rule of King Ramkhamhaeng the Great of Sukhothai, Thai influence first reached Nakhon Si Thammarat. According to the Ramkhamhaeng inscription, Nakhon Si Thammarat was a tributary state of Sukhothai. During most of later periods, Nakhon became a tributary of Ayutthaya.

The deep south belonged to the Malay sultanates of Pattani and Kedah, while the northernmost part of the peninsula was under the control of Bangkok.

During the Thesaphiban reforms at the end of the 19th century, both Nakhon Si Thammarat and Pattani were incorporated into the central state. The area was subdivided into 5 monthon, which were installed to control the city states (mueang). Minor mueang were merged into larger ones, thus forming the present 14 provinces. With the Anglo-Siamese Treaty of 1909 the boundary to Malaysia was fixed. Kedah came under British control, while Pattani stayed with Siam.

== Languages ==
The main language is Southern Thai (Thai: ภาษาไทยใต้ [pʰaːsǎː tʰajtâːj]), also known as Pak Thai or Dambro (Thai: ภาษาตามโพร [pʰaːsǎː taːmpʰroː]), which is a southwestern Tai language spoken in the 14 changwat of southern Thailand as well as by small Thai communities in the northernmost Malaysian states. It is spoken natively by roughly five million people and as a second language by the 1.5 million native speakers of Patani Malay, along with other ethnic groups such as the local Negritos communities, and other tribal groups.

Third largest vernacular language in Southern Thailand is Laeng Kha Luang (Southern Thai: แหลงข้าหลวง [lɛ̌ːŋ.kʰàːlûːəŋ], literally: Received Pronunciation), the Southern Thai language based with decidedly Krungthep accent (the prestige accent spoken by Thai Chinese in Bangkok). With roughly four hundred thousand native speakers, in particular, it is native only among some Thai Chinese (Teochew, Hoklo, Hakka and Cantonese, but not the Peranakans nor the Hainan group in Southern Thailand, who speak Southern Thai). Particularly in their major ethnic enclaves like Hat Yai and Bandon districts the ethnic Chinese. Althrough this variety mostly are Southern Thai in spoken form, the Southern Thai and Central Thai languages share significantly mutual intelligibility (like English and Scots), the phonology systems are very different, this make most of other Southern Thai speakers treat them as Central Thai dialect, usually bully Laeng Kha Luang speakers when they attempted to speak full function Southern Thai, and consider them as passive natives.

Do not confuse this, a speaking Central Thai with a Southern Thai accent called Phud Thong Daeng (Thai: พูดทองแดง) or Laeng Thong Daeng (Southern Thai: พูดทองแดง)

== Administrative divisions ==
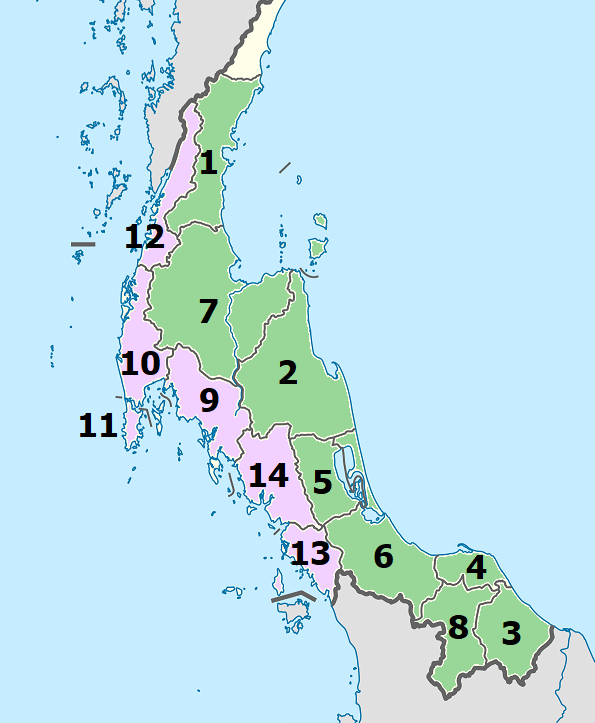

The Office of the National Economic and Social Development Council (NESDC) identities Southern Thailand as 14 provinces.
The Thai Meteorological Department (TMD) includes for Southern Thailand (east coast) also the two provinces of Prachuap Khiri Khan and Phetchaburi.

	Name	Thai	Area	Pop.	Dens.	Annual income	Poverty Ratio	Coastal region
1	Chumphon	ชุมพร	6,009.0	510,963	85	351,672	5.4%	East
2	Nakhon Si Thammarat	นครศรีธรรมราช	9,942.5	1,560,433	157	301,488	8.1%	East
3	Narathiwat	นราธิวาส	4,475.0	802,474	179	238,680	37.3%	East
4	Pattani	ปัตตานี	1,940.4	718,077	370	210,156	36.0%	East
5	Phatthalung	พัทลุง	3,424.5	525,044	153	257,736	14.0%	East
6	Songkhla	สงขลา	7,393.9	1,432,628	194	331,920	8.2%	East
7	Surat Thani	สุราษฎร์ธานี	12,891.5	1,063,501	83	437,592	1.4%	East
8	Yala	ยะลา	4,521.1	532,326	118	187,008	21.2%	East
9	Krabi	กระบี่	4,709.0	473,738	101	372,132	6.4%	West
10	Phang Nga	พังงา	4,170.0	268,240	64	346,104	5.1%	West
11	Phuket	ภูเก็ต	543.0	410,211	755	378,000	0.5%	West
12	Ranong	ระนอง	3,298.0	191,868	58	264,420	16.6%	West
13	Satun	สตูล	2,479.0	321,574	130	278,496	5.8%	West
14	Trang	ตรัง	4,917.5	643,116	131	279,708	15.9%	West

Average household annual income in 2015 (Thai baht).
Poverty Ratio in 2016.

== Demography ==
Southern Thailand has 9.454 million inhabitants and its population density is 134 per square kilometre (350/sq mi).

=== Ten major cities ===
No.	Name	Pop.	Metropolitan
1	Hat Yai	159,627	397,379 in Hat Yai District.
2	Surat Thani	130,114	177,242 in Mueang Surat Thani District.
3	Nakhon Si Thammarat	104,948	271,330 in Mueang Nakhon Si Thammarat District.
4	Phuket	78,923	238,866 in Mueang Phuket District.
5	Ko Samui	65,847	82,900 in Ko Samui–Ko Pha Ngan.
6	Songkhla	64,602	163,083 in Mueang Songkhla District.
7	Yala	61,293	167,582 in Mueang Yala District.
8	Trang	59,999	156,115 in Mueang Trang District.
9	Pattani	44,900	130,178 in Mueang Pattani District.
10	Narathiwat	41,572	124,049 in Mueang Narathiwat District.

== Religion ==
Religion in Southern Thailand (2015 census)
1. Buddhism (73.5%)
2. Islam (26.3%)
3. Christianity (0.21%)
4. Sikhism (0.01%)
5. Other religions (0.00%)
6. No religion (0.01%)

Thailand is a Buddhist-majority country. About 93.46% in Thailand follow Buddhism. Buddhism is the majority religion in southern Thailand as well but makes up 75.45% of the region's people. The Thai follow Theravada Buddhism. Minority ethnic groups such as Khmer also follow Buddhism, and 10 of the 14 provinces in southern Thailand have Buddhist majorities.

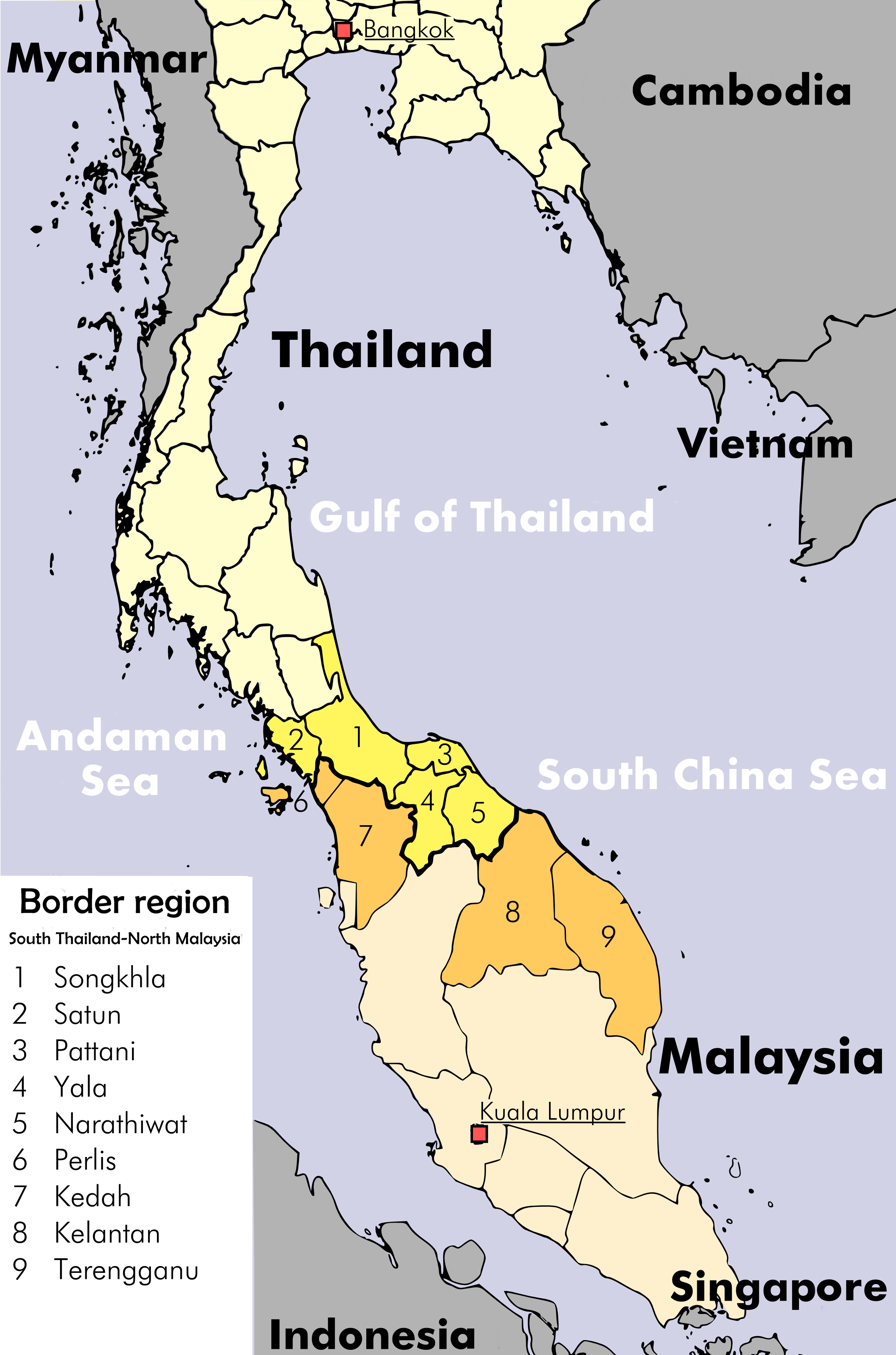
Malay Muslim provinces in southern Thailand and northern Malaysia.

Islam constitutes 24.33% of Southern Thailand even though it constitutes only 5.36% of the whole country. Islam is mostly followed by the Malay people in Southernmost Thailand: Yala, Pattani, Naratiwat and Satun provinces, near Malaysia. There is also a small Thai Muslim population.

Christianity makes up 0.21% of Southern Thailand's population. Sikhism makes up 0.05% in the region and is practiced by Indian immigrants.

== Economy ==
The bulk of the region's population relies on agriculture for 27 percent of its gross regional product in 2014. It is followed by industry (12 percent), trade (10 percent), transportation (9 percent), tourism (8 percent), and construction and property (7 percent).

For FY 2018, Southern Thailand Region had a combined economic output of 1,402 trillion baht (US$45.2 billion), or 8.6 percent of Thailand's GDP. Surat Thani province had an economic output of 206.869 billion baht (US$6.67 billion), which is equal to a GPP per capita of 182,371 baht (US$5,883), more than double for Yala province, which is fifth and more than three times for Narathiwat province, lowest in the ranking.

Gross Provincial Product (GPP)
Rank	Province	GPP (million baht)	Population (x 1000)	GPP per capita (baht)
1	Surat Thani	206,869	1,134	182,371
2	Chumphon	87,746	498	176,200
3	Songkhla	248,386	1,635	151,918
4	Nakhon Si Thammarat	164,375	1,507	109,050
5	Yala	43,006	468	91,815
6	Pattani	48,549	641	75,697
7	Phatthalung	36,006	492	73,213
8	Narathiwat	44,778	721	62,066
	East coast	879,715	7,096	123,973

View source data.

Gross Provincial Product (GPP)
Rank	Province	GPP (million baht)	Population (x 1000)	GPP per capita (baht)
1	Phuket	234,028	580	403,534
2	Phang-nga	78,493	250	313,919
3	Krabi	86,684	418	207,415
4	Satun	31,215	290	107,505
5	Ranong	28,014	269	103,966
6	Trang	64,586	630	102,589
	West coast	523,020	2,437	214,616

View source data.

== Transportation ==
Southern Thailand is connected with Bangkok by railway and highway. Several regional airports are located at the larger towns. The transportation hub of all of southern Thailand is Hat Yai.

=== Road ===
Phetkasem Road, the longest road in Thailand, runs from Bangkok along the Kra Isthmus and then along the west coast of the peninsula. From Trang, it crosses over to the east coast to Hat Yai, and ends at the Malaysian border.

Two Asian highways run through southern Thailand: Asian Highway 2 runs mostly parallel to the railroad all the way from Bangkok. It crosses to Malaysia at Sadao, and continues on the west side of the peninsula. Asian Highway 18 begins in Hat Yai and runs south along the east coast, crossing to Malaysia at Sungai Kolok.

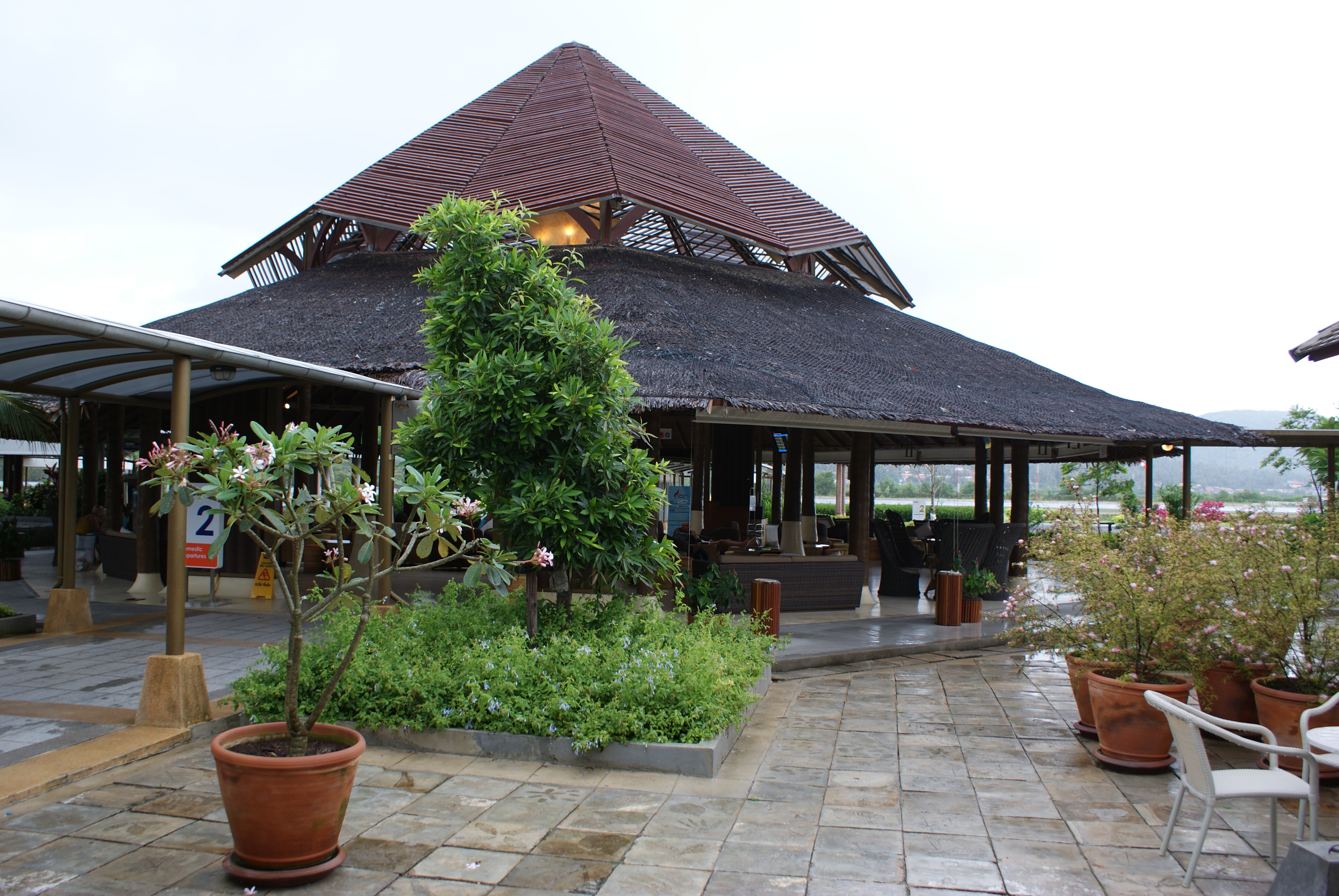
Ko Samui Airport

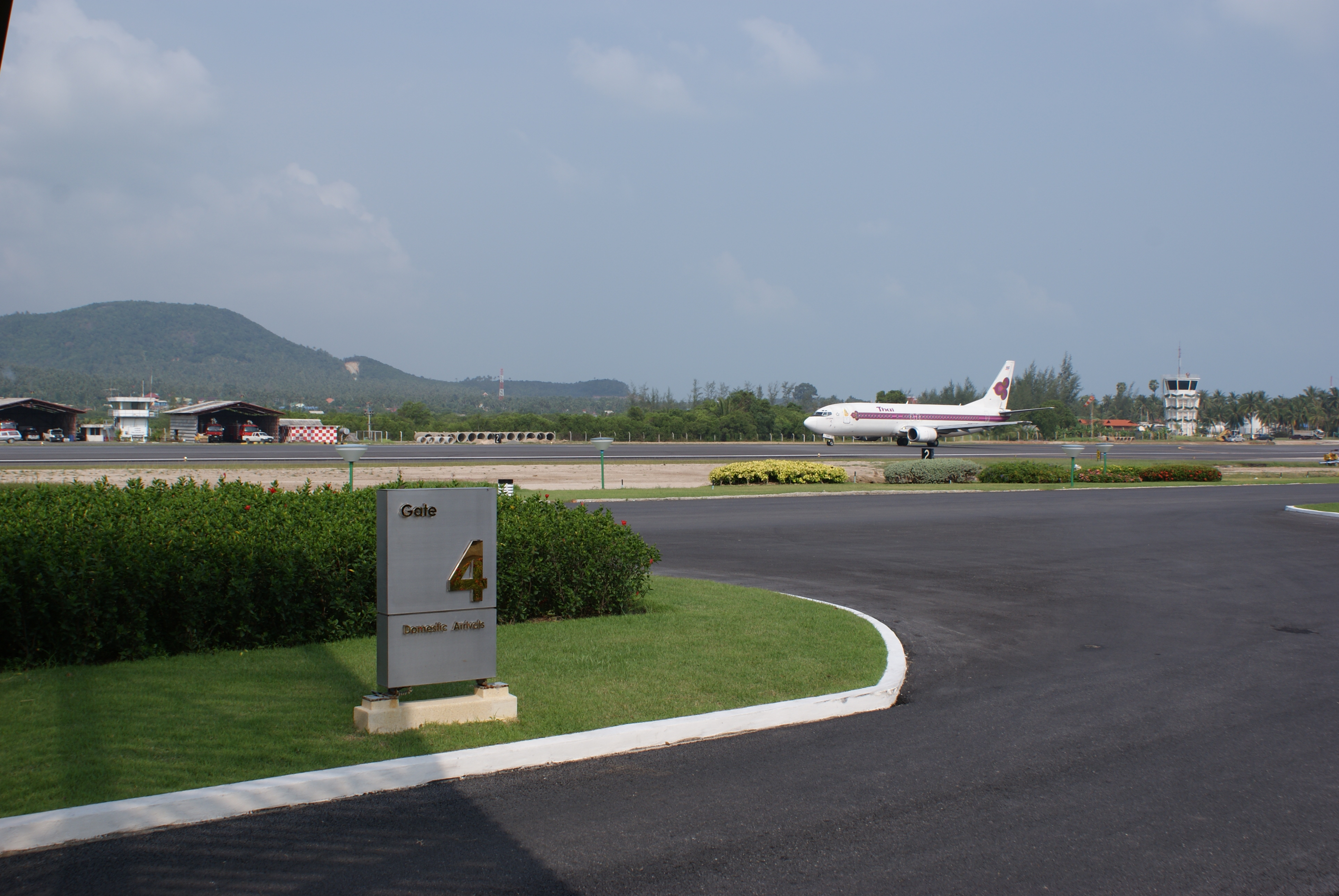
Ko Samui Airport runway

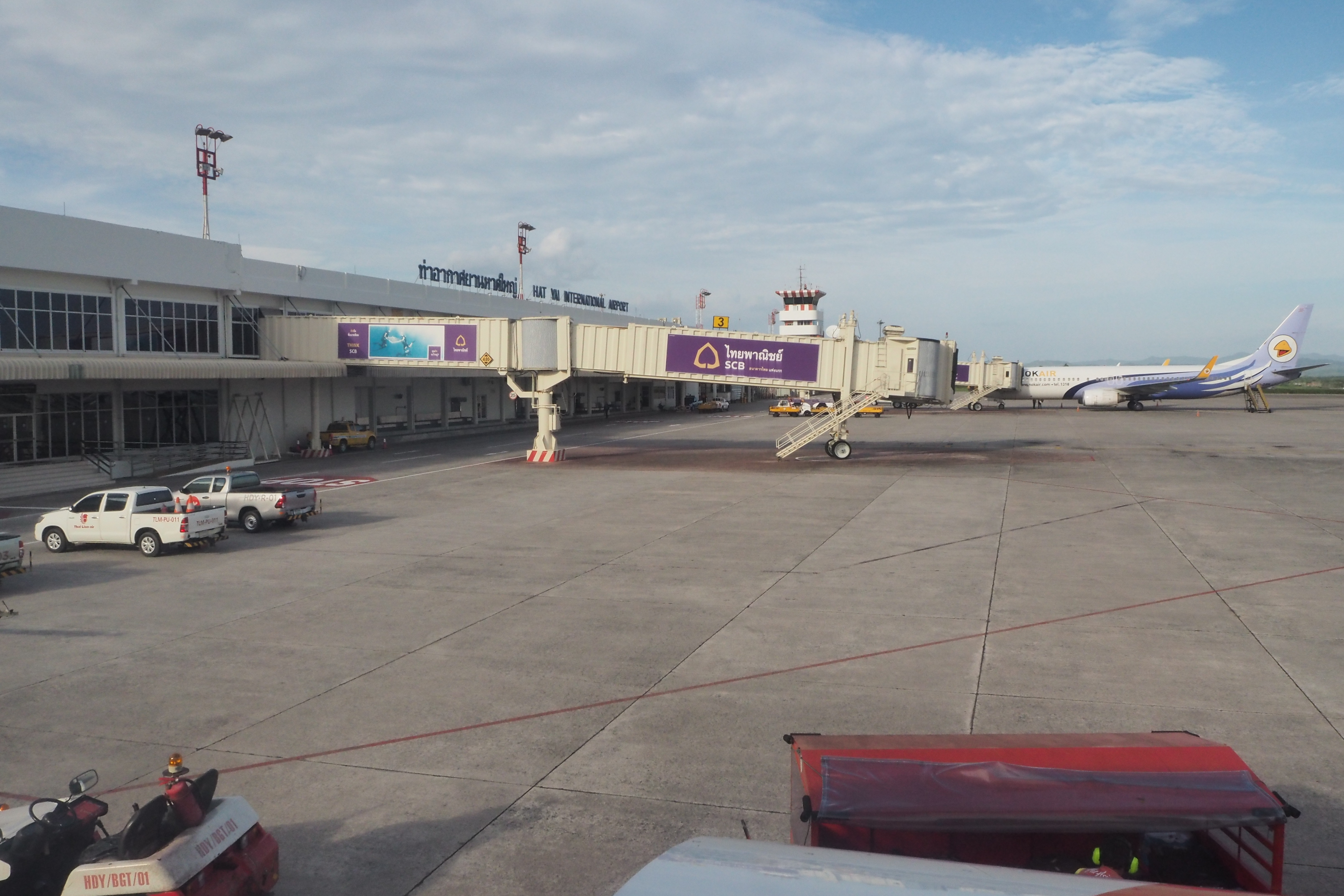
Hat Yai Airport

=== Rail ===
The southern railway connects Bangkok to Hat Yai and continues from there to Sungai Kolok. There are branches from Ban Thung Phoe Junction to Kirirat Nikhom. Two smaller branches of the railway run from Thung Song to Trang and Nakhon Si Thammarat and from Hat Yai Junction to Malaysia and Singapore.

=== Air ===
Southern Thailand has five international airports and six domestic airports. As of 2018 Thailand's transport ministry is constructing the 1.9 billion baht Betong Airport. It is scheduled for completion in 2020.

- Chumphon Airport
- Hat Yai International Airport
- Krabi International Airport
- Nakhon Si Thammarat Airport
- Narathiwat Airport
- Pattani Airport
- Phuket International Airport
- Ranong Airport
- Ko Samui International Airport
- Surat Thani International Airport
- Trang Airport

== See also ==
- South Thailand insurgency
- Yawi language
- OK Betong — Thai film set in Southern Thailand.
