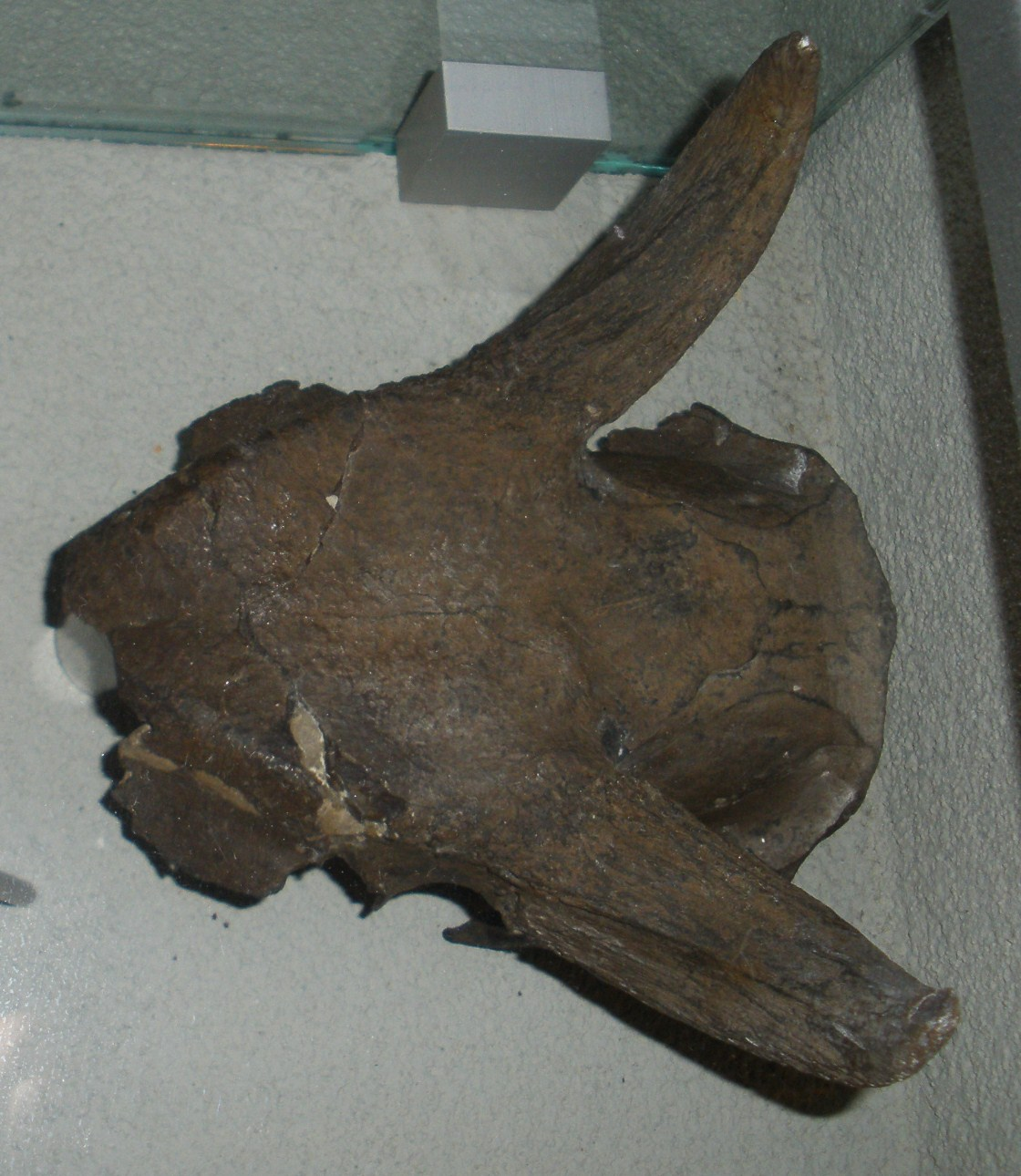
- Duboisia santeng skull

Scientific classification
- Kingdom: Animalia
- Phylum: Chordata
- Class: Mammalia
- Infraclass: Placentalia
- Order: Artiodactyla
- Family: Bovidae
- Subfamily: Bovinae
- Genus: †Duboisia; Stremme, 1911
- Species: †D. santeng

Binomial name
- †Duboisia santeng (Dubois, 1891)

Synonyms
- Anoa santeng Dubois, 1891; Antilope modjokertensis Von Koenigswald, 1934; Duboisia kroesenii (Dubois, 1907); Tetraceros kroesenii Dubois, 1907; Tetracerus kroesenii Dubois, 1908

= Duboisia santeng =

Duboisia santeng Temporal range: 0.781–0.126 Ma

Extinct species of antelope

Duboisia santeng or Dubois' antelope is an extinct antelope-like bovid that was endemic to Indonesia during the Pleistocene. It went extinct during the Ionian stage of the Pleistocene, about 750.000 years ago. Duboisia santeng was first described by the Dutch paleoanthropologist and geologist Eugène Dubois in 1891.

The species is most closely related to the modern Nilgai (Boselaphus tragocamelus) and the Four-horned antelope (Tetracerus quadricornis). Antilope modjokertensis is a junior synonym for Duboisia santeng.

== Description ==
It was a small to middle-sized antelope, with body mass estimates ranging from 32 kg to 84 kg, with an average value of 54 kg. Both sexes had horns, which were subtriangular at base and ranged from 6 cm to 9 cm in length.

== Behaviour and habitat ==
Duboisia santeng was a forest-dwelling animal that preferred forest with a close canopy. Examination of this species tooth has shown that it was a browser, primarily feeding on leaves and occasionally on harder vegetation. The habitat ranged from moderately to very humid forests.

Duboisia santeng is part of the Trinil Fauna of Java. It shared its habitat with Bos palaesondaicus, the Indian muntjak (Muntiacus muntjak), Bubalus palaeokerabau and Stegodon trigonocephalus. Predators of the Trinil Fauna were the Trinil tiger (Panthera tigris trinilensis) or the Trinil Dog Mececyon trinilensis, which could have preyed upon Duboisia santeng.
