= Trinil H. K. Fauna =

The Trinil H. K. Fauna, or Trinil Haupt Knochenschicht Fauna (Trinil "main fossil-bearing layer" Fauna) is a biostratigraphic faunal assemblage. It is another interpretation of the collection of fossils gathered by Eugène Dubois at Trinil, where he discovered the early hominid fossils of Java Man. It was proposed in the 1980s a group of Dutch paleontologists to reassess the date of the layer in which Java Man was found.

== Works cited ==
- de Vos, John; Sartono, S.; Hardjasasmita, S.; Sondaar, P. Y. (1982), "The fauna from Trinil, type locality of Homo erectus: a reinterpretation", Geologie en Mijnbouw, 61: 207–11
- de Vos, John; Sondaar, P. Y. (1994), "Dating hominid sites in Indonesia", Science, 266 (5191): 1726–27, Bibcode:1994Sci...266.1726D, doi:10.1126/science.7992059, PMID 7992059
- de Vos, John (2004). "The Dubois collection: a new look at an old collection". Scripta Geologica. 4: 267–285. ISSN 0922-4564.
- Kaifu, Yousuke; Etty Indriati; Fachroel Aziz; Iwan Kurniawan; Hisao Baba (2010). "Cranial Morphology and Variation of the Earliest Indonesian Hominids". In Christopher J. Norton; David R. Braun (eds.). Asian Paleoanthropology: From Africa to China and Beyond. Vertebrate Paleobiology and Paleoanthropology Series. Dordrecht: Springer. pp. 143–157. doi:10.1007/978-90-481-9094-2_11. ISBN 978-90-481-9093-5. (online).
- Zaim, Yahdi (2010), "Geological Evidence for the Earliest Appearance of Hominins in Indonesia", in John G. Fleagle; et al. (eds.), Out of Africa I: The First Hominin Colonization of Eurasia, Vertebrate Paleobiology and Paleoanthropology Series, Dordrecht: Springer, pp. 97–110, doi:10.1007/978-90-481-9036-2_7, ISBN 978-90-481-9035-5, (online)

== See also ==
- Trinil Fauna
