= Lang Rongrien Rock Shelter =

Lang Rongrien
- Location in Thailand
- 8.180060°N 98.880840°E
- Location: Thailand

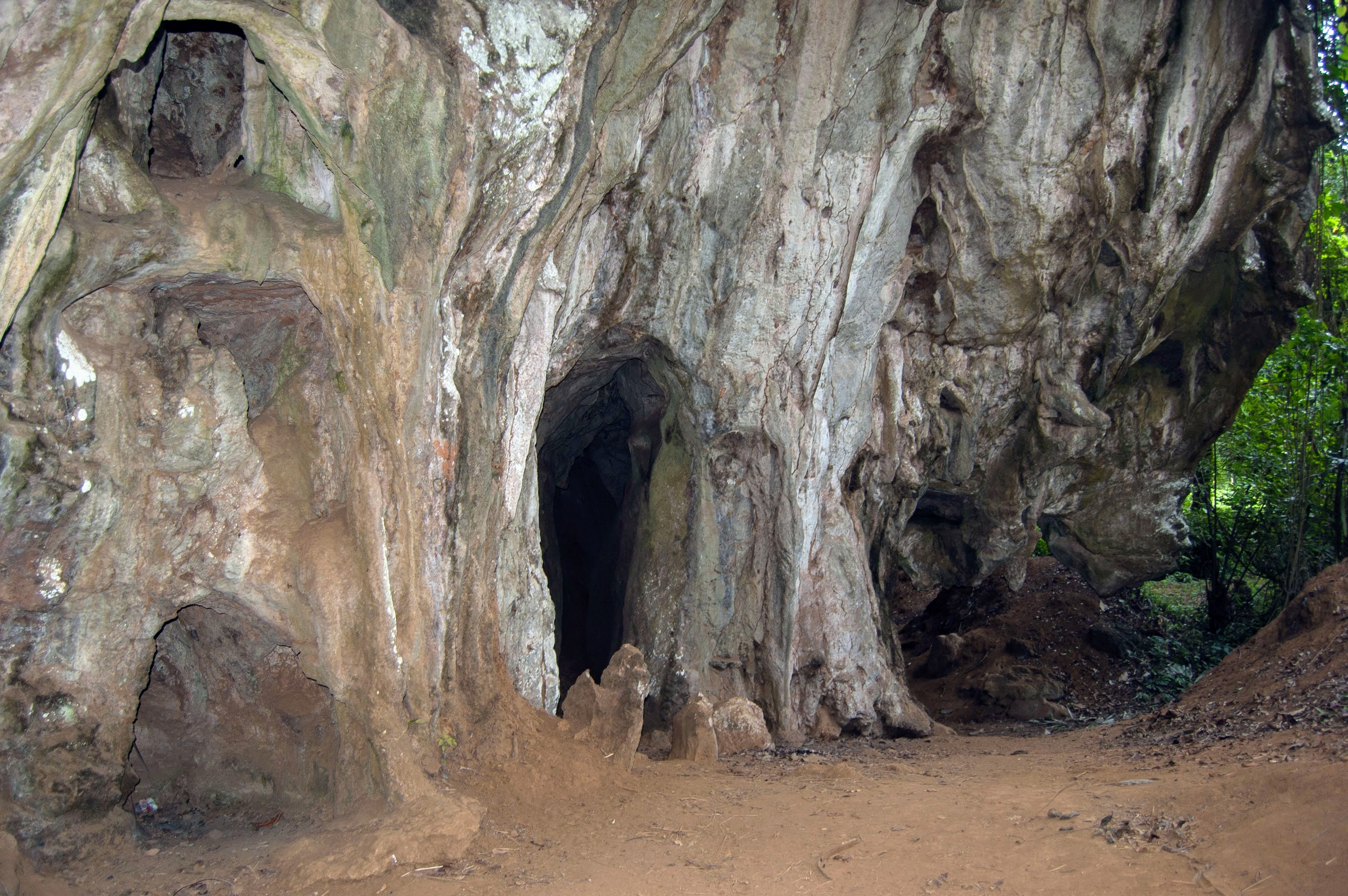
Lang Rongrien Exterior

Lang Rongrien (Thai: หลังโรงเรียน, lit. 'behind the school') (Note: RTGS: Lang Rongrian; from แหล่งโบราณคดีถ้ำหลังโรงเรียนบ้านทับปริก, laeng borannakhadi tham lang rongrian Ban Thap Prik 'cave behind Ban Thap Prik School archaeological site') is a rock shelter and Hoabinhian habitation site in the upland region of Krabi province in west-coast southern Thailand. The site is of the Pleistocene, early Holocene archaeological time frame. Excavations at the site began in 1974, and primary research was headed by Douglas Anderson. Though this rock shelter site is not as large as some others, it is archaeologically rich in its findings. Some of the sediment at the site was disturbed by soil collections, but not enough to have ruined the more impressive archaeological finds. The site is located within the Krabi River valley, in a somewhat hard-to-reach area that can only be accessed from a steep trail below the rock shelter, or a narrow ridge that approaches the rock shelter from the north. Radiocarbon dating at the site has put the evidence from between 39,000 and 28,000 years before present.

== Habitation ==
Hoabinhian habitation sites are most often found in rock shelters, and are found all across southeast Asia. The Hoabinhian hunter-gatherers who lived at the Lang Rongrien rock shelter used the site as a temporary habitation site, inhabited on a seasonal basis. There are multiple generations of inhabitance at Lang Rongrien. The oldest use for the rock shelter was as a campground for hunters in the late Pleistocene epoch. In the early Holocene epoch the rock shelter was also used for habitation. The last time the site was inhabited about 4,000 years ago it was used again as a campground, but was also used as a grave site. All of these distinct periods of habitation at the rock shelter contain periods of time in-between when no one seemingly inhabited the site at all.

== Archaeological findings ==
=== Cultural deposit layers ===
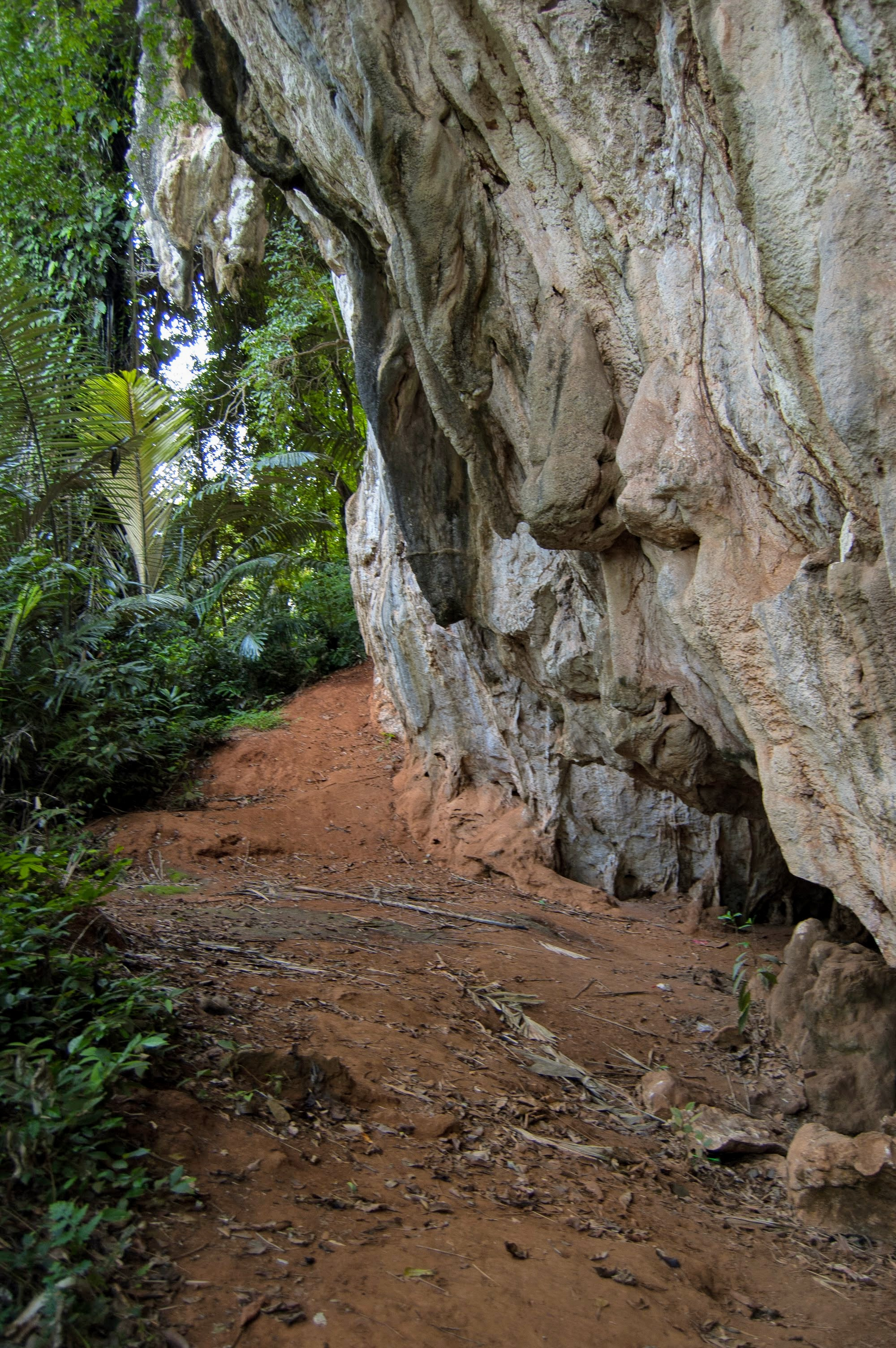
Lang Rongrien Rock Shelter

The excavated areas of the Lang Rongrien rock shelter have been divided into ten stratigraphic layers, or cultural deposit layers, that tell archaeologists what was happening there and when. The 10th and lowest cultural deposit layer does not contain any artifacts. The eighth and ninth layers are similar to each other, with charcoal remains, stone artifacts and flakes, and animal bones that are scattered about among these layers. Those artifacts are also seen in concentrated areas around campfires. The seventh layer is composed entirely of limestone that is broken apart. Archaeologists have concluded that this is because of some kind of geological process, though what exactly is unclear. The most likely answer is that the roof of the cave collapsed, leaving this layer of limestone. The 5th and 6th layers are also similar to each other. They are characterized by an abundance of hearths built on the floor of the cave, which are then surrounded by ash, charcoal bits, rocks that have been cracked because of fire, animal remains, stone artifacts and other artifacts that suggest the area was inhabited by humans. The upper most layers of the rock shelter contain much of what the lower layers also contain: charcoal bits, food remains, and stone artifacts. However, the most distinct findings from these layers are four Hoabinhian burials and grave goods that go with those burials.

=== Dating ===
The dating at Lang Rongrien was done by radiocarbon dating pieces of charcoal that come from the stratigraphic layers. The oldest pieces of charcoal found in the lower most layers where human habitation is seen have been dated to around 39,000 years ago. A piece of charcoal found in the 7th layer has been dated to almost 45,000 years ago, but this is likely because it came from the roof fall, and does not indicate anything about human habitation at this site. Charcoal pieces from the upper layers have been dated to about 9,000 years ago. The most recent dates from the site come from pieces of pottery found with the burial goods, and are placed at an age of 3,000 to 5,000 years ago.

=== Burials ===
The four burials found in the excavated portions at Lang Rogrien are all different from each other. The first was discovered during the initial survey of the site because of the disturbance caused by soil collectors. The remains in burial 1 were in what is commonly referred to by archeologists as an extended position. Burials 2 and 3 are composed of scattered bones from two to three individuals, and are secondary burials. Burial 4 was in an upward facing flexed position. Every burial had pottery associated with them as grave goods. The pottery of burials 4 and 1 are similar. All are what is referred to as a pedestaled pots with shallow bowls, and only one of the pots was found to be incomplete. The pedestals and bowls were made and dried separately, and then attached by creating a cross-hatch pattern where they are to be connected and glued by using a clay paste. There are no designs, as the vessels have a smooth exterior, and were fired unevenly as seen by the burnt splotches on the pots. These pots most resemble those found at Ban Kao and have led archaeologists to believe that Lang Rongrien is related to Ban Kao in some way. The pottery from burials 2 and 3 is different, though there are no intact pots for archaeologists to study. The pot sherds found associated with burials 2 and 3 have no pedestal, and are instead small with round bottoms and vertical cord-marked patterns around the rim. Because there are so little remains of these kinds of vessels archaeologists are unsure if this kind of pottery is associated with the burials or not, even though they were found within the burial sites. Burial 4 also featured a finely polished axe or adz blade.
