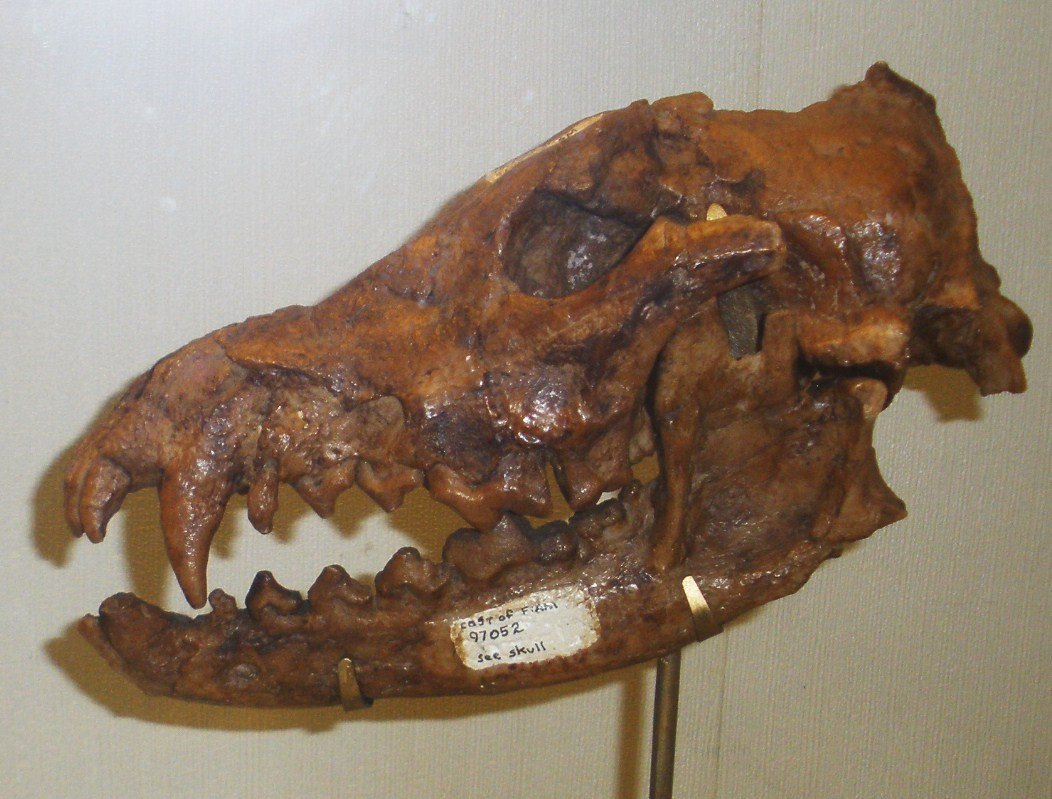
- Canis (Xenocyon) falconeri skull

Scientific classification
- Kingdom: Animalia
- Phylum: Chordata
- Class: Mammalia
- Order: Carnivora
- Family: Canidae
- Genus: Canis
- Subgenus: †Xenocyon; Kretzoi, 1938

Type species
- †Xenocyon lycaonoides Kretzoi, 1938

Species
- †Canis (Xenocyon) africanus; †Canis (Xenocyon) antonii; †Canis (Xenocyon) falconeri; †Canis (Xenocyon) lycanoides

= Xenocyon =

Xenocyon Temporal range: Pliocene to Middle Pleistocene

Extinct subgenus of carnivores

Xenocyon ("strange dog") is an extinct group of canids, either considered a distinct genus or a subgenus of Canis. The group includes Canis (Xenocyon) africanus, Canis (Xenocyon) antonii and Canis (Xenocyon) falconeri that gave rise to Canis (Xenocyon) lycanoides. Xenocyon lycaonoides has been suggested to have been a hypercarnivore, and a cooperative pack hunter. Xenocyon is thought to be closely related and possibly ancestral to modern dhole and the African wild dog, as well as the insular Sardinian dhole.

== Taxonomy ==
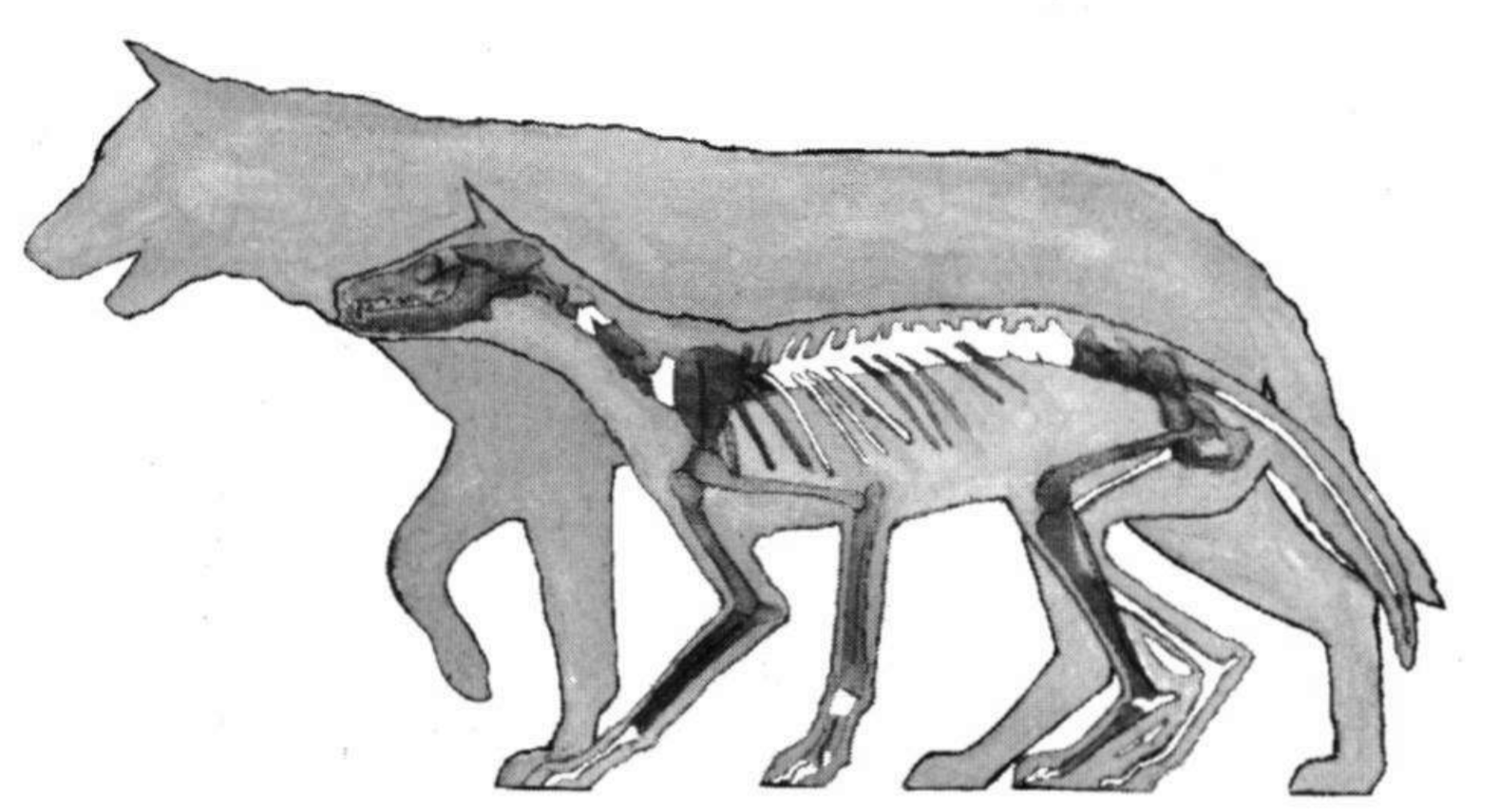
Skeleton of Cynotherium sardous matched with outline of Xenocyon lycaonoides (large)

Xenocyon is proposed as a subgenus of Canis named Canis (Xenocyon). One taxonomic authority proposes that as part of this subgenus, the group named Canis (Xenocyon) ex gr. falconeri (ex gr. meaning "of the group including") would include all of the large hypercarnivorous canids that inhabited the Old World during the Late Pliocene–Early Pleistocene: Canis (Xenocyon) africanus in Africa, Canis (Xenocyon) antonii in Asia and Canis (Xenocyon) falconeri in Europe. Further, these three could be regarded as extreme geographical variations within the one taxon. This group was hypercarnivorous, had a large body size that is comparable with the northern populations of the modern gray wolf (Canis lupus) and are characterized by a short neurocranium relative to their skull size.

The ancestral condition for canids is to have five toes on their forelimbs, but by the Early Pleistocene this lineage had reduced this to four, which is also a characteristic feature of the modern African wild dog (Lycaon pictus). The African wild dog cannot be positively identified in the fossil record of eastern Africa until the middle Pleistocene, and identifying the oldest Lycaon fossil is difficult because these are hard to distinguish from Canis (Xenocyon) africanus. Some authors consider Canis (Xenocyon) lycanoides as ancestral to the genera Lycaon and Cuon. Therefore, one taxonomic authority has proposed that all of the Canis (Xenocyon) group should be reclassified into the genus Lycaon. This would form three chronospecies: Lycaon falconeri during the Late Pliocene of Eurasia, Lycaon lycaonoides during the Early Middle Pleistocene of Eurasia and Africa and Lycaon pictus from the Middle Late Pleistocene to present.

== Species ==
=== Canis (Xenocyon) africanus ===
The species was originally named Canis africanus (Pohle 1928) but was later reassigned as Canis (Xenocyon) africanus. It existed during the Late Pliocene and Early Pleistocene of Africa.

=== Canis (Xenocyon) antonii ===
The species was originally named Canis antonii (Zdansky 1924) but was later reassigned as Canis (Xenocyon) antonii. It existed during the late Pliocene and Early Pleistocene of Asia. The name was applied to Late Pliocene fossils of canids with hypercarnivorous dentition that were found in China at the sites Loc. 33 (Yangshao, Henan), Loc. 64 (Zhili Province) and Fancun, Shanxi Province. The species was recorded in Europe as Canis (Xenocyon) falconeri.

=== Canis (Xenocyon) falconeri ===
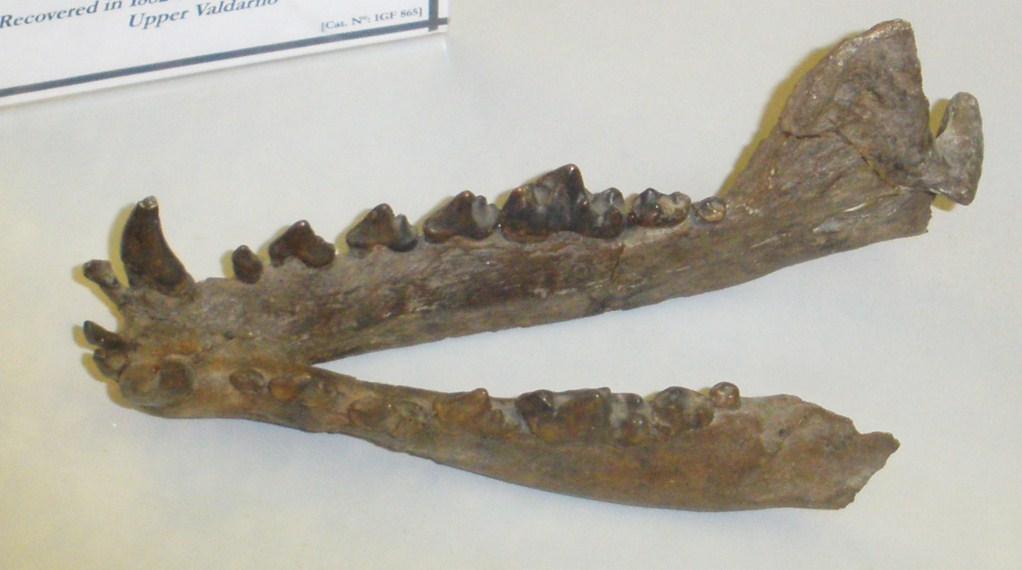
Canis (Xenocyon) falconeri mandible

Upper Valdarno is the name given to that part of the Arno valley situated in the provinces of Florence and Arezzo, Italy. The region is bounded by the Pratomagno mountain range to the north and east and by the Chianti mountains to the south and west. The Upper Valdarno Basin has provided the remains of three fossil canid species dated to the Late Villafranchian era of Europe 1.9-1.8 million years ago that arrived with a faunal turnover around that time (Early Pleistocene). It is here that the Swiss paleontologist Charles Immanuel Forsyth Major discovered Falconer's wolf (Canis falconeri) (Forsyth Major 1877). The species was later reassigned as Canis (Xenocyon) falconeri, but was later regarded as the European arrival of Canis (Xenocyon) antonii. The species gave rise to Canis (Xenocyon) lycanoides.

=== Canis (Xenocyon) lycaonoides ===
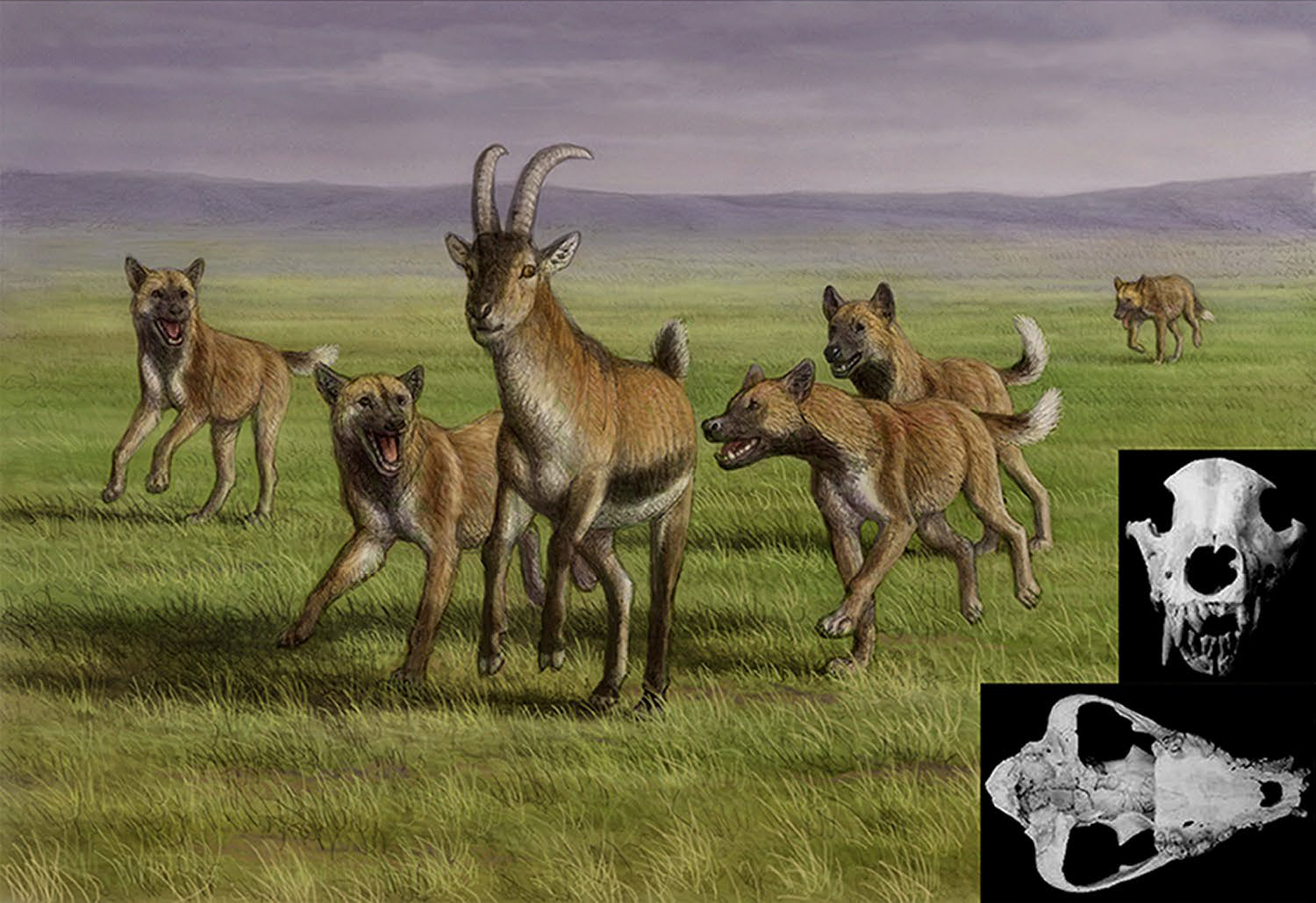
Restoration of Xenocyon hunting the goat Hemitragus

The species was originally named Xenocyon lycaonoides (Kretzoi 1938) but was later reassigned as Canis (Xenocyon) lycanoides.

Another view is that lycaonoides and falconeri should be classified under genus Lycaon, to give the descent of 3 chronospecies: L. falconeri Late Pliocene of Eurasia → L. lycaonoides Early Pleistocene and the beginning of the Middle Pleistocene of Eurasia and Africa → L. pictus Middle Pleistocene to the present day.

The diversity of the wolf-sized species decreased by the end of the Early Pleistocene and into the Middle Pleistocene of Europe and Asia. These wolves include the large hypercarnivorous Canis (Xenocyon) lycaonoides that was comparable in size with the modern gray wolf (C. lupus) northern populations and the small Mosbach wolf (C. mosbachensis) that is comparable in size to the modern Indian wolf (C. l. pallipes). Both types of wolves could be found existing from England and Greece across Europe to the high latitudes of Siberia through to Transbaikalia, Tajikistan, Mongolia, and China. Remains of both canid species are also found in Ubeidiya, in the southern Levant. The true gray wolves did not make an appearance until the end of the Middle Pleistocene, 500-300 thousand years ago.

Fossil evidence to dated 1.8 million years ago from Dmanisi, Georgia in the southern Caucasus suggests that they were cooperative hunters which cared for their sick, injured and disabled pack members similar to the modern grey wolf.

It preyed on antelope, deer, elephant calves, aurochs, baboons, wild horses and possibly humans. It was probably the ancestor of the African wild dog (Lycaon pictus) and possibly the dhole (Cuon alpinus) of southeastern Asia, the extinct Sardinian dhole (Cynotherium sardous) and perhaps two extinct Javanese dogs (Merriam's dog (Megacyon merriami) and the Trinil dog (Mececyon trinilensis)).

A recent description of a hemimandible of Xenocyon lycaonoides, from the Middle Pleistocene of the Baikal area, stated that the size of the mandible was comparable to that of modern large canids, such as the grey wolf. The study also estimated the mass of the animal to be around 45 to 50 kilograms.

Just before the appearance of the dire wolf (Aenocyon dirus), North America was invaded by the genus Xenocyon, which was as large as A. dirus and more hypercarnivorous. The fossil record shows them as rare and it is assumed that they could not compete with the newly derived A. dirus. These have been ascribed to Xenocyon lycaonoides, with Xenocyon texanus from as far south as Texas as its taxonomic synonym.
