= Trinil Fauna =

The Trinil Fauna is a biostratigraphic faunal assemblage composed from several Javanese sites by Ralph von Koenigswald. Von Koenigswald assigned the early hominid fossils Java Man to the Trinil Fauna after discovering the main fossil of Java Man, a skullcap catalogued as "Trinil 2", in the same geological horizon.

== Works cited ==
- Vos, John de (2004), "The Dubois collection: a new look at an old collection", Scripta Geologica, 4: 267–85, ISSN 0922-4564.

== See also ==
- Trinil H. K. Fauna
