= Megacyon =

Merriam's dog Temporal range: Early Pleistocene

Scientific classification
- Kingdom: Animalia
- Phylum: Chordata
- Class: Mammalia
- Order: Carnivora
- Family: Canidae
- Genus: †Megacyon von Koenigswald, 1940
- Species: †M. merriami

Binomial name
- †Megacyon merriami

Extinct species of carnivore

Megacyon merriami, or Merriam's dog, was a prehistoric canid that lived on the island of Java in Indonesia during the Early Pleistocene. Its scientific name means "Merriam's large dog".

== Description ==
Megacyon was relatively larged sized, with an estimated body mass of around 49–54 kilograms (108–119 lb), comparable to a grey wolf. In comparison to its ancestor Xenocyon, the hypocone on the teeth was larger.

== Ecology ==
Megacyon is thought to have been a hypercarnivore that preyed on large-sized prey such as deer.

== Taxonomy and evolution ==
Megacyon is thought to have evolved from mainland species of Xenocyon, with Megacyon being even larger than mainland Xenocyon species. Some authors have subsumed Megacyon into Xenocyon. Megacyon is thought to be the ancestor of the much smaller Mececyon known from younger deposits on Java. Megacyon are currently around the 49-54 kilogram size range due to their evolution and niche overlapping with tigers. As tigers and Megacyon had a 100% niche overlap, Megacyon evolved to be smaller in size in order to avoid this niche overlap for the species survival.
