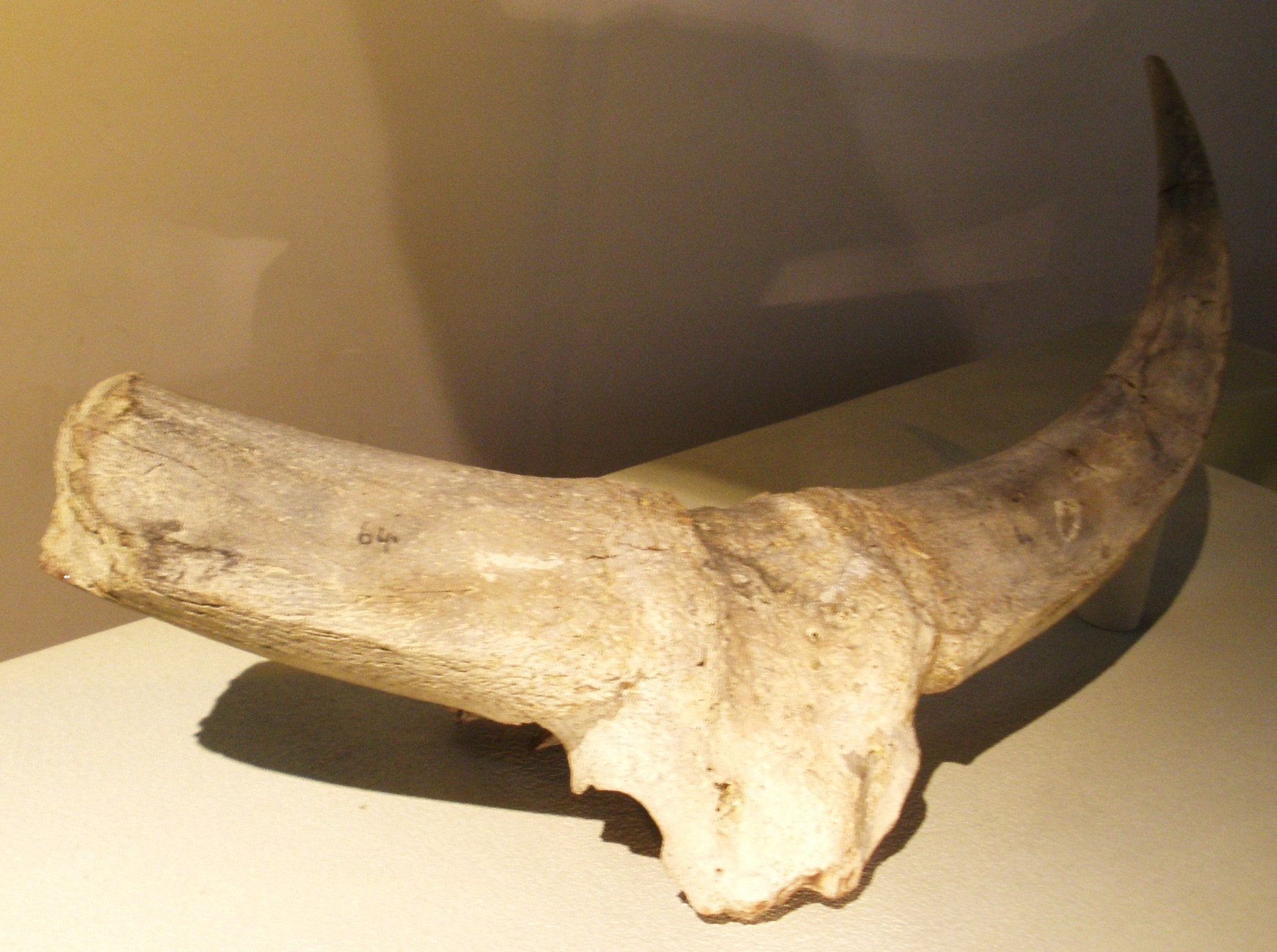
- Partial skull fossil at Naturalis

Scientific classification
- Kingdom: Animalia
- Phylum: Chordata
- Class: Mammalia
- Order: Artiodactyla
- Family: Bovidae
- Subfamily: Bovinae
- Genus: Bubalus
- Species: †B. palaeokerabau

Binomial name
- †Bubalus palaeokerabau (Dubois, 1908)

= Bubalus palaeokerabau =

Bubalus palaeokerabau Temporal range: Late Pleistocene

Extinct species of bovid

Bubalus palaeokerabau is an extinct species of water buffalo that was endemic to Java during the Late Pleistocene.

B. palaeokerabau can be distinguished from more recent domestic water buffalo introduced to Java by their larger size and their extremely long horns, which can be around 2.5 m (8.2 ft) long from tip to tip.
