= Krabi River =

River in Thailand

Coordinates: 8.0451°N 98.9193°E

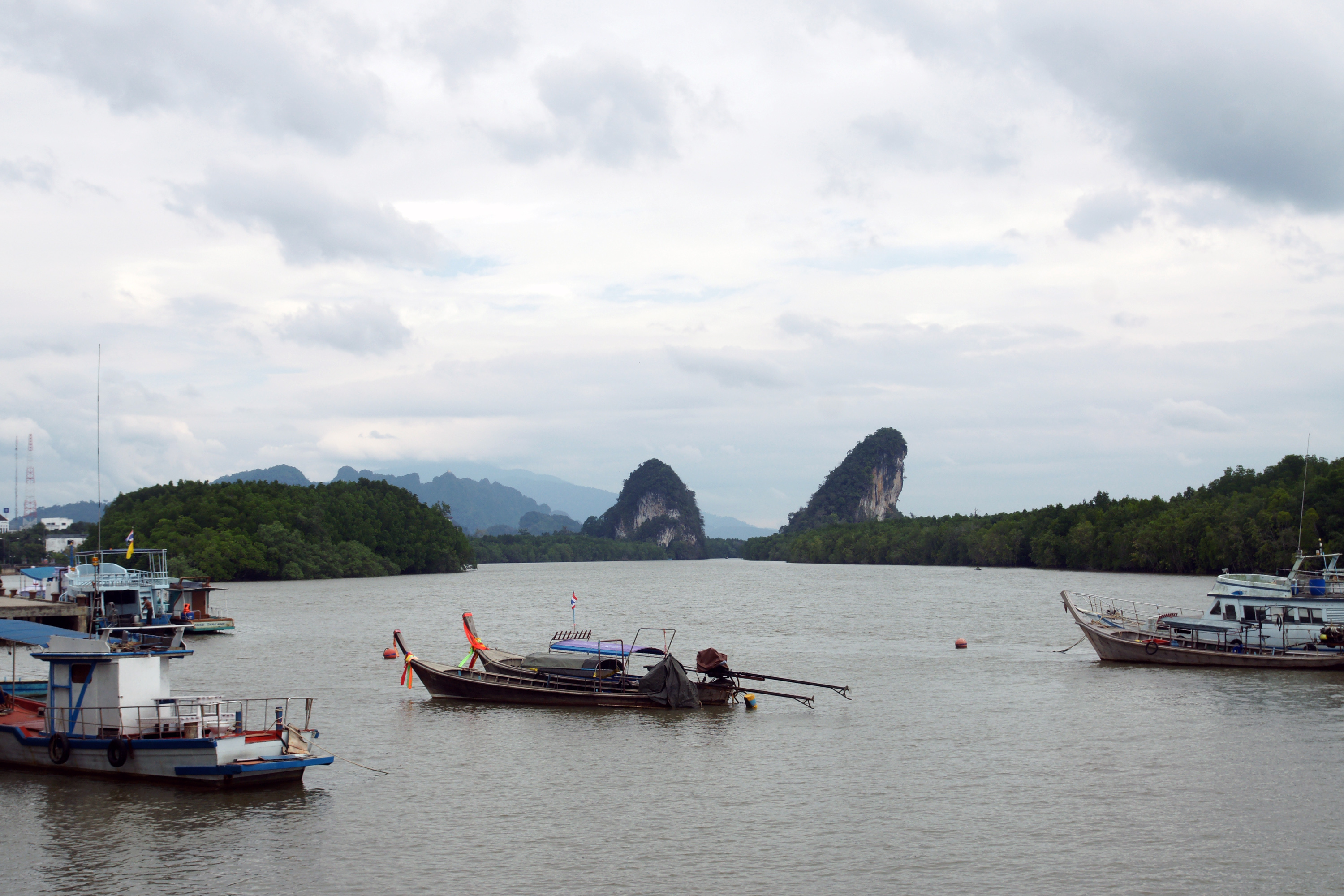
River view from Krabi Town, Krabi, Thailand.

The Krabi River (Thai: แม่น้ำกระบี่, RTGS: Maenam Krabi, pronounced [mɛ̂ː.náːm krā.bìː]) is a river in Southern Thailand. The Krabi river is 5 kilometres long, as it is the main channel within a larger estuary to the Andaman Sea. The other two main channels are the Yuan River to the south and Chi Lat to the west. The 31 km upper stretch of the river are named Khlong Krabi Yai, which originates at the Phanom mountain.

The estuary of the Krabi river is listed as Ramsar wetland number 1100 since July 5 2001. The protected area of 213 km^{2} covers more than 100 km^{2} of mangrove forests and 12 km^{2} of up to 2 km wide tidal mudflats. The area is popular with birdwatchers coming to spot some of the most diverse and rare species in the world, the masked finfoot and the brown-winged kingfisher to name just a few.

The town - Krabi has a reputation for its tourism. It is situated along the seaboard of the Andaman Sea. This town gave the Krabi river its name.
