= Faunal assemblage =

Group of associated animal fossils found together in a given stratum

In archaeology and paleontology a faunal assemblage is a group of animal fossils found together in a given stratum. In a non-deformed deposition, fossils are organized by stratum following the laws of uniformitarianism and superposition, which state that the natural phenomena observable today (such as death, decay, or post-mortem transport) also apply to the paleontological record and that the oldest stratum will be at the bottom of a paleontological deposit.

The principle of faunal succession is used in biostratigraphy to determine each biostratigraphic unit, or biozone. The biostratigraphic unit is a section of geological strata that is defined on the basis of its characteristic fossil taxa or faunal assemblage. Faunal assemblages are also analyzed in archaeological deposits, where they are influenced by cultural activities in addition to ecological processes and natural taphonomy.

== Taphonomy ==
Taphonomy is translated from Greek as "laws of burial" (taphos + nomos). From death to discovery, many processes can affect the burial and preservation of a faunal assemblage including decay, transport, bioturbation, biostratinomy (physical alterations due to sedimentation), and diagenesis (the process by which organic material is converted to mineral). Based on these preservation factors, skeletons and hard parts are most likely to be preserved in faunal assemblages. Taphonomic processes can cause significant "information loss".

Most often if an animal dies, the flesh decays first, leaving its bones susceptible to taphonomic processes. Preservation depends on mineral composition and preservation varies with bone density as well as sediment composition. For example, arid or highly saline conditions preserve bones better than wet acidic environments. Other environments that are more likely to preserve faunal remains include sediment slumps in lakes, sink holes, or caves. In these cases, faunal assemblages may represent long-term accumulation rather than one-time events.

== Life vs. Death Assemblages ==
Life and death assemblages are differentially defined in paleontology and archaeology.

=== Paleontology ===
A life assemblage is a faunal assemblage consisting of a single biological community preserved in the environment in which it lived. Conversely, a death assemblage is composed of species that did not live in the place they were deposited and incorporated into the paleontological record. A mixed assemblage contains both non-transported and transported fossils.

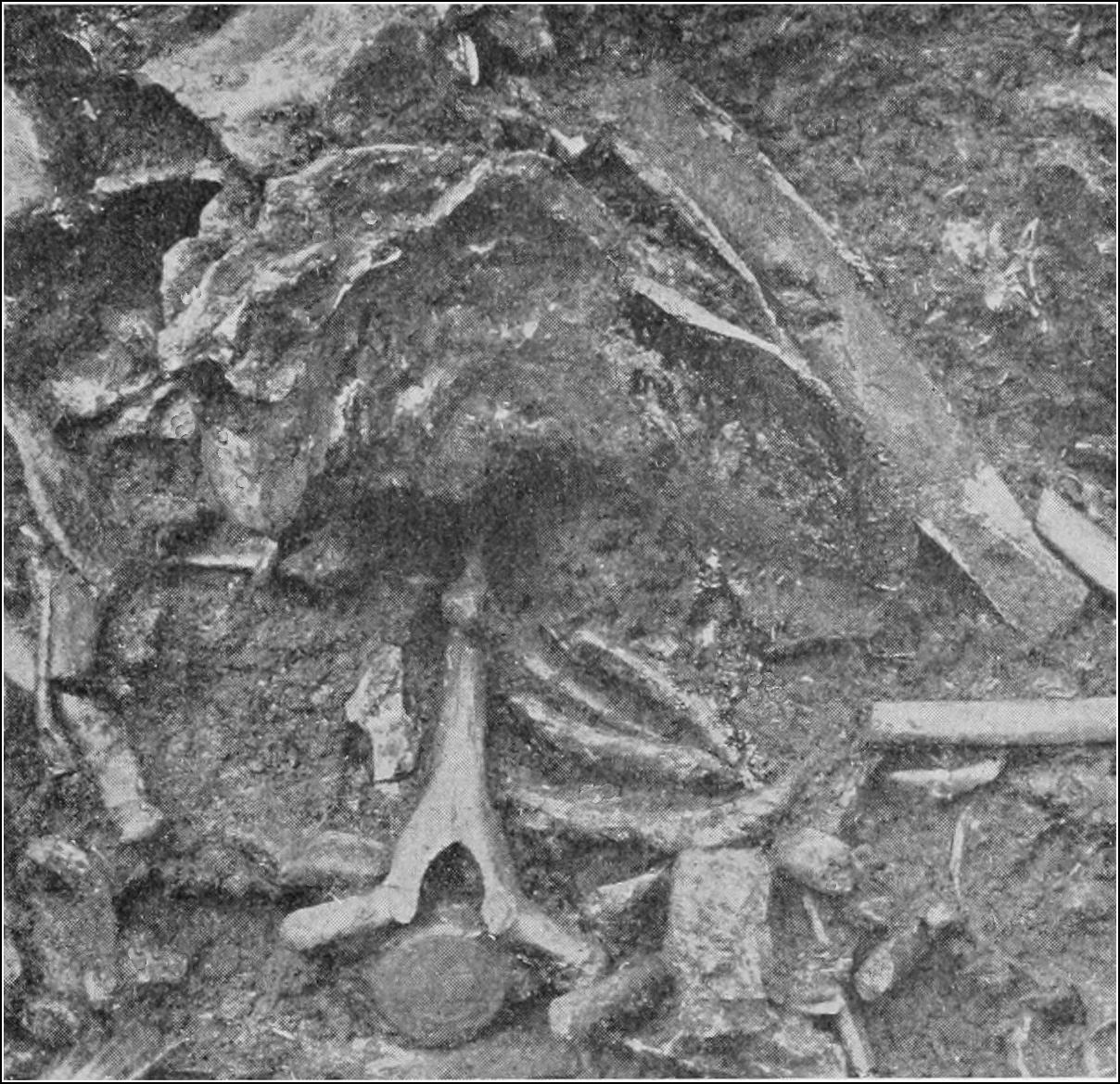
Paleontological faunal remains at the La Brea Tar Pits which comprise a faunal assemblage.

Time-averaging is the phenomenon in which geologic events appear to have happened at the same time based on pooling available fossil evidence. Time-averaging occurs when faunal assemblages are mixed across chronological strata and varies across faunal assemblages. For life assemblages in which a community was completely buried in-situ by a sudden event such as a storm or mudslide, time averaging does not affect interpretation. However, most faunal assemblages are mixed or death assemblages which have been affected by taphonomic processes which influence paleontological analysis and interpretation. Although radiocarbon dating is expensive and not possible for specimens older than 50,000 years, when individual bones can be dated researchers can avoid the problems associated with time-averaging.

A frequently used faunal assemblage in paleontology and paleoclimatology is the use of foraminifera assemblages as a proxy of past climate and sea levels. Foraminifera are marine microorganisms that are abundant in most parts of the world's ocean and are indicators of ocean temperature, salinity, upwelling intensity, primary productivity, and more.

Hominid evolution can also be tracked alongside shifting faunal assemblages. For example, in East Africa, a distinctive group of animal species, mostly suids and elephantoids, is characteristic of the fossils preserved from 3.5 Ma to 4.5 Ma. This faunal assemblage has been used effectively to chronologically correlate the East African early hominid sites.

Faunal assemblages are useful in determining the foraging patterns of hominids. One such assemblage at Lang Rongrien in Thailand indicated a hunter-gatherer group which was highly flexible when it came to finding food. They relied heavily on turtle and tortoise to supply the meat portion of their diet when hunting large game was unpredictable. This assemblage also suggested the paleoenvironment was drier and cooler than today because of a distinct lack of pig bones.

=== Archaeology ===
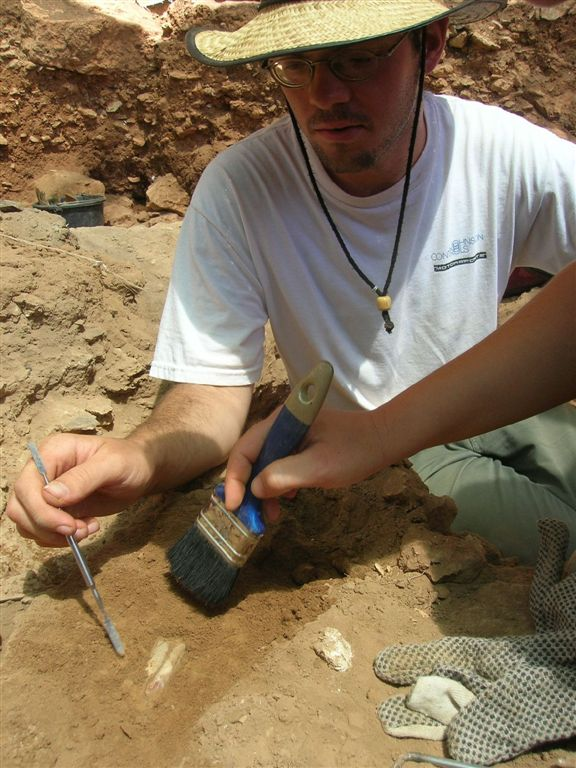
Excavation of animal bones from one stratum in an archaeological site.

In archaeology a life assemblage is defined as the animal community which co-occurred in time and space with the human population that created the archaeological deposit. A death assemblage, on the other hand, is that which is used by people and preserved in an archaeological site.

If using the paleontological definition of a death assemblage, in archaeology, the faunal assemblage is inherently a death assemblage, since archaeologists assume that humans killed the animals found within the deposits. The taphonomic modifications made by cultural processes are split into two categories, the first being those which the archaeologist cannot control and the second being a direct consequence of an archaeologists' methods. Archaeological deposits are always affected by cultural processes and therefore represent human activities, rather than a complete ecological community. These human activities may include subsistence hunting, agriculture, ritual use, and more.

An example of a taphonomic disadvantage in archaeological faunal assemblages is the effects of domestic dogs on the assemblages. By scavenging or through direct feeding by their human counterparts, dogs and other canids can such severe damage to the bones that identification by archaeologists is impossible. This causes site interpretation problems.

== See also ==
- Lagerstätte
- La Brea Tar Pits
- Tanis Fossil Site
