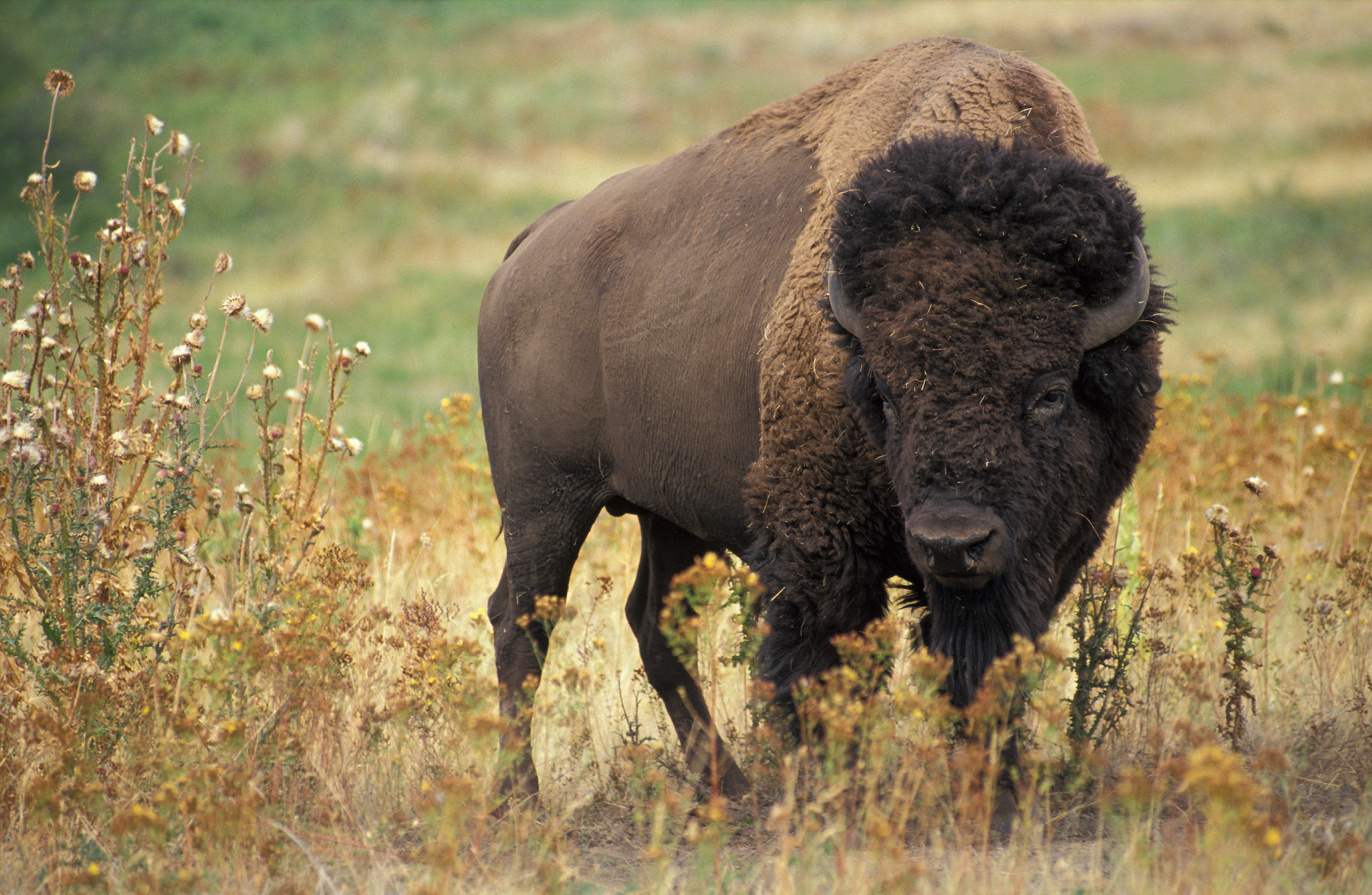
- American bison (Bison bison)
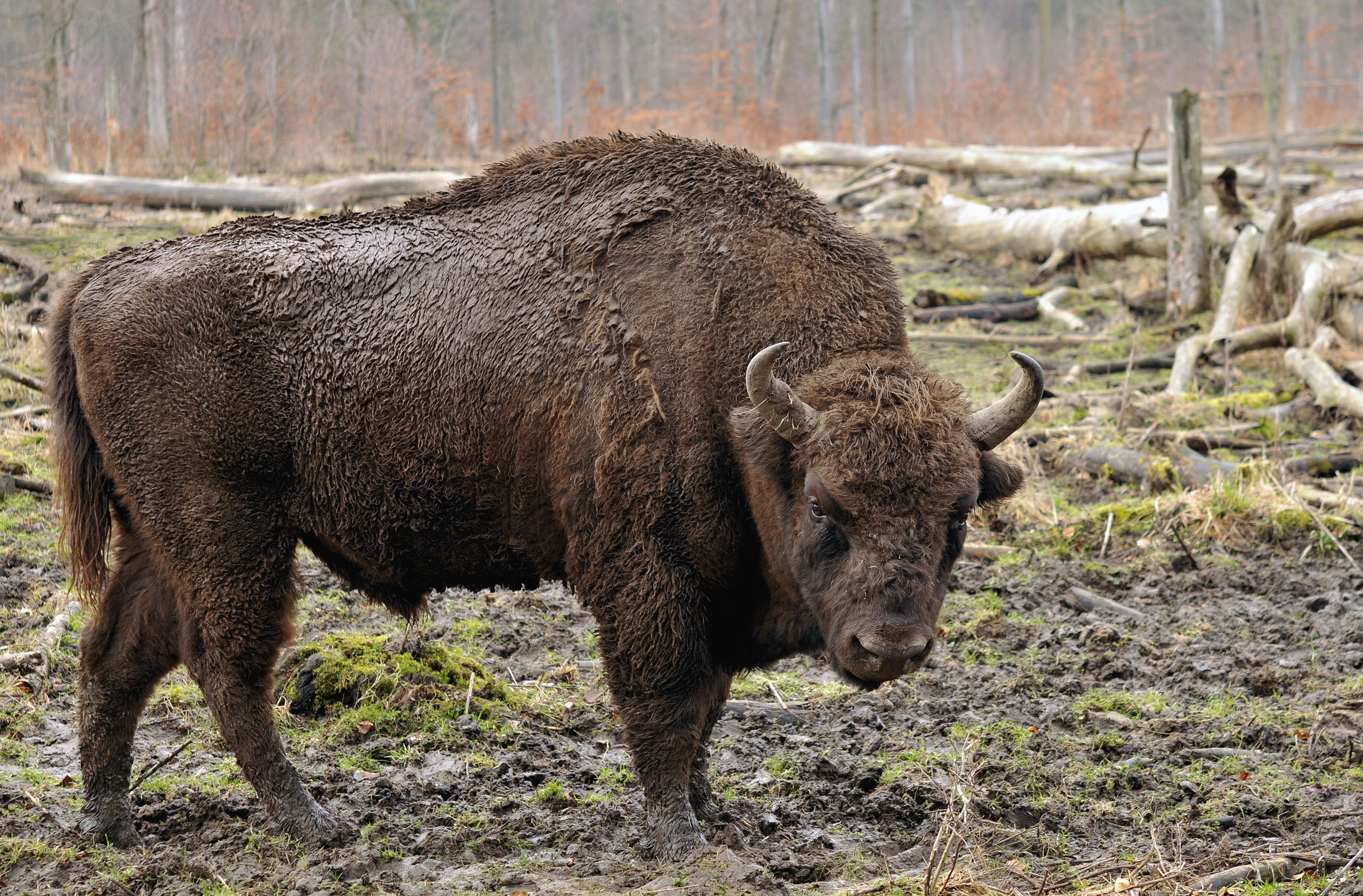
- European bison (Bison bonasus)

Scientific classification
- Kingdom: Animalia
- Phylum: Chordata
- Class: Mammalia
- Order: Artiodactyla
- Family: Bovidae
- Subfamily: Bovinae
- Genus: Bos
- Subgenus: Bison; Hamilton Smith, 1827

Type species
- Bison bison Linnaeus, 1758

Species
- Eobison (traditionally recognised as a subgenus); †B. constantini; †B. palaeosinensis; †B. sivalensis; †B. georgicus; †B. degiulii?; Traditionally recognised subgenus Bison; †B. schoetensacki; †B. hanaizumiensis; †B. menneri; †B. voigtstedtensis; †B. antiquus; †B. latifrons; †B. occidentalis; †B. priscus; B. bison; B. bonasus; Incertae sedis; †B. tamanensis
- IUCN range of the two American bison subspecies Plains bison (Bison bison subsp. bison) Wood bison (Bison bison subsp. athabascae)
- IUCN range of the European bison European bison (Bison bonasus)

Audio
- American bison

= Bison =

Bison Temporal range: 2.6–0 Ma Early Pleistocene – present

Genus of mammals

A bison (pl.: bison) is a large bovine in the subgenus Bison (from Greek, meaning 'wild ox') within the tribe Bovini. Two extant and numerous extinct species are recognised.

Of the two surviving species, the American bison, B. bison, found only in North America, is the more numerous. Although colloquially referred to as a buffalo in the United States and Canada, it is more closely related to yaks and cattle than to the true buffalo. The North American species is composed of two subspecies, the Plains bison, B. b. bison, and the generally more northern wood bison, B. b. athabascae. A third subspecies, the eastern bison (B. b. pennsylvanicus) is no longer considered a valid taxon, being a junior synonym of B. b. bison. Historical references to "woods bison" or "wood bison" from the Eastern United States refer to this synonym animal (and to their eastern woodland habitat), not to B. b. athabascae, which was not found in the region. Its European kind B. bonasus or wisent —also 'zubr' or colloquially 'European buffalo'— is found in Europe and the Caucasus, reintroduced after being extinct in the wild.

While bison species have been traditionally classified in their own genus, modern genetics indicates that they are nested within the genus Bos, which includes, among others, cattle, yaks and gaur, being most closely related to yaks.

== Description ==
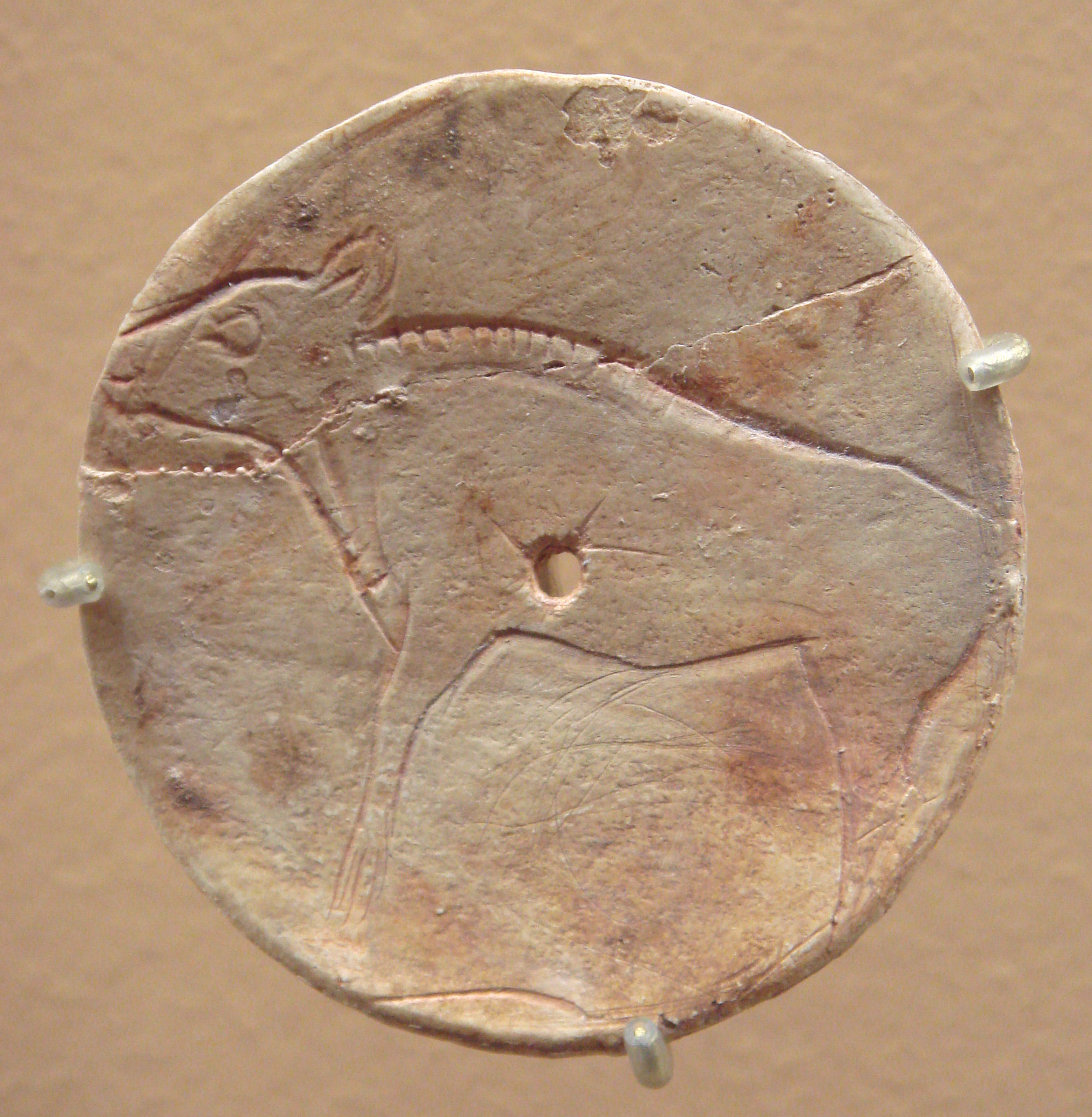
Magdalenian bison on plaque, 17,000–9,000 BC, Bédeilhac Cave, Ariège

The American bison and the European bison (wisent) are among the largest surviving terrestrial animals in North America and Europe. They are typical artiodactyl (cloven hooved) ungulates, and are similar in appearance to other bovines such as cattle and true buffalo. They are broad and muscular with shaggy coats of long hair. Adults grow up to 2 metres (6 feet 7 inches) in height and 3.5 m (11 ft 6 in) in length for American bison and up to 2.1 m (6 ft 11 in) in height and 2.9 m (9 ft 6 in) in length for European bison. American bison can weigh from around 400 to 1,270 kilograms (880 to 2,800 pounds) and European bison can weigh from 800 to 1,000 kg (1,800 to 2,200 lb). European bison tend to be taller than American bison.

Bison are nomadic grazers and travel in herds. The bulls leave the herds of females at two or three years of age, and join a herd of males, which usually are smaller than female herds. Mature bulls rarely travel alone. Towards the end of the summer, for the reproductive season, the sexes necessarily commingle.

American bison are known for living in the Great Plains, but formerly had a much larger range, including much of the eastern United States and parts of Mexico. Both species were hunted close to extinction during the 19th and 20th centuries, but have since rebounded. The wisent in part owes its survival to the Chernobyl disaster, as the Chernobyl Exclusion Zone has become a kind of wildlife preserve for wisent and other rare megafauna such as the Przewalski's horse, though poaching has become a threat in the 21st century. The American Plains bison is no longer listed as endangered, but this does not mean the species is secure. Genetically pure B. b. bison currently number only about 20,000, separated into fragmented herds—all of which require active conservation measures. The wood bison is on the endangered species list in Canada and is listed as threatened in the United States, though numerous attempts have been made by beefalo ranchers to have it entirely removed from the Endangered Species List.

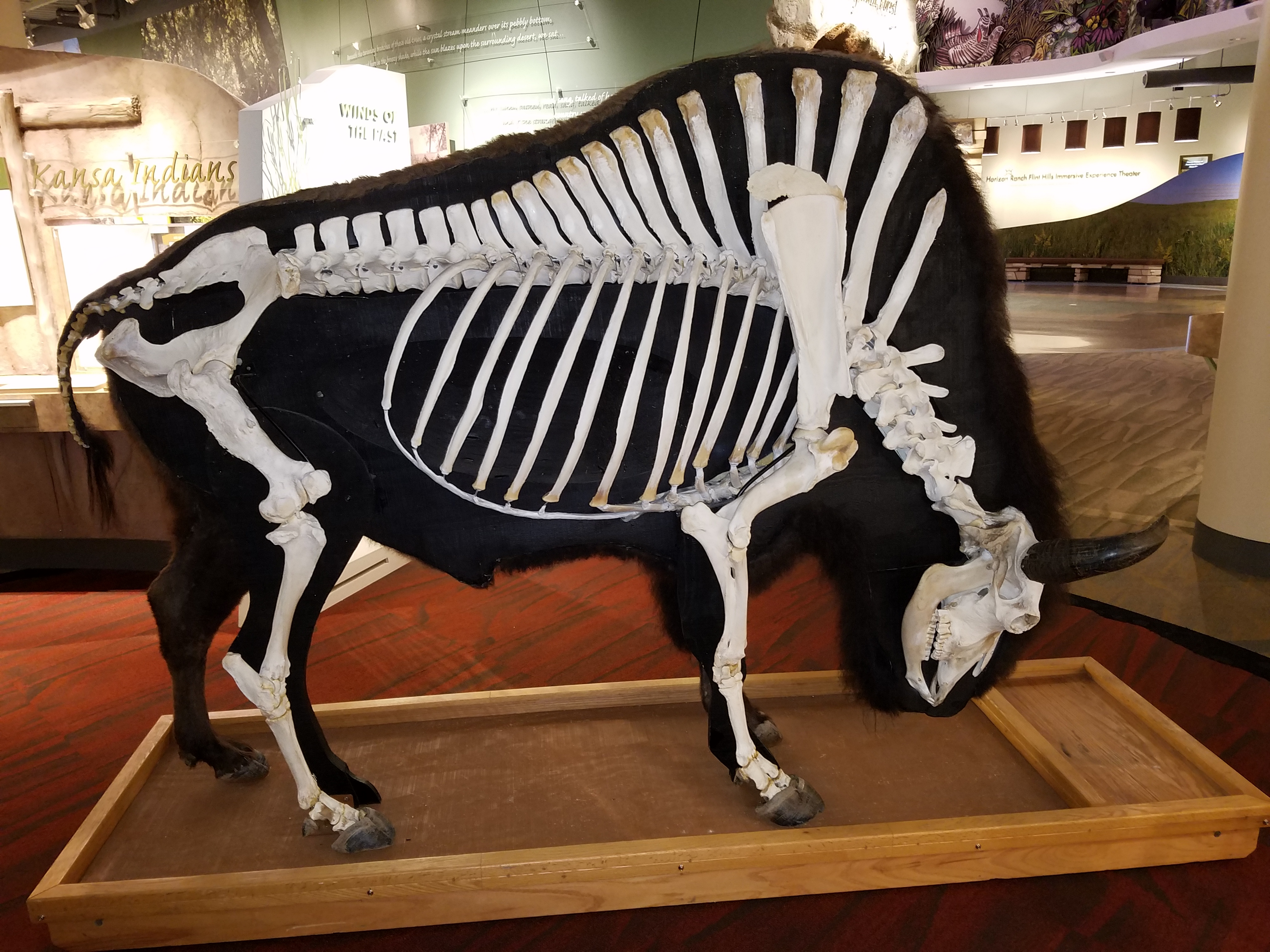
A museum display shows the full skeleton of an adult male American bison.

Although superficially similar, physical and behavioural differences exist between the American and European bison. The American species has 15 ribs, while the European bison has 14. The American bison has four lumbar vertebrae, while the European has five. (The difference in this case is that what would be the first lumbar vertebra has ribs attached to it in American bison and is thus counted as the 15th thoracic vertebra, compared to 14 thoracic vertebrae in wisent.) Adult American bison are less slim in build and have shorter legs. American bison tend to graze more, and browse less than their European relatives. Their anatomies reflect this behavioural difference; the American bison's head hangs lower than the European's. The body of the American bison is typically hairier, though its tail has less hair than that of the European bison. The horns of the European bison point through the plane of their faces, making them more adept at fighting through the interlocking of horns in the same manner as domestic cattle, unlike the American bison, which favours butting. American bison are more easily tamed than their European cousins, and breed with domestic cattle more readily.

== Evolution and genetic history ==
The bovine tribe (Bovini) split about 5 to 10 million years ago into the buffalos (Bubalus and Syncerus) and a group leading to bison and taurine cattle. Genetic evidence from nuclear DNA indicates that the closest living relatives of bison are yaks, with bison being nested within the genus Bos, rendering Bos without including bison paraphyletic. While nuclear DNA indicates that both extant bison species are each other's closest living relatives, the mitochondrial DNA of European bison is more closely related to that of domestic cattle and aurochs (while the mitochondrial DNA of American bison is closely related to that of yaks). This discrepancy is either suggested to be the result of incomplete lineage sorting or ancient introgression. Bison are widely believed to have evolved from a lineage belonging to the extinct genus Leptobos during the Late Pliocene to Early Pleistocene in Asia. The earliest members of the bison lineage, known from the Late Pliocene to Early Pleistocene of the Indian Subcontinent (Bison sivalensis) and China (Bison palaeosinensis), approximately 3.4-2.6 million years ago (Ma) are placed in Eobison. The oldest remains of Eobison in Europe are those Bison georgicus found in Dmanisi, Georgia, dated to around 1.76 Ma. When treated as a genus, more derived members of the group are placed in the subgenus Bison, which first appeared towards the end of the Early Pleistocene, around 1.2 Ma, with early members of the subgenus including the widespread Bison schoetensacki.

The steppe bison (Bison priscus) first appeared during the mid-Middle Pleistocene in eastern Eurasia, and subsequently became widely distributed across Eurasia. During the late Middle Pleistocene, around 195,000-135,000 years ago, the steppe bison migrated across the Bering land bridge into North America, becoming ancestral to North American bison species, including the large Bison latifrons, and the smaller Bison antiquus, which became extinct at the end of the Late Pleistocene. Modern American bison are thought to have evolved from B. antiquus during the Late Pleistocene-Holocene transition via the intermediate form Bison occidentalis. The European bison, Bison bonasus, first appeared in Europe during the late Middle Pleistocene, where it existed in sympatry with the steppe bison. Its relationship with other extinct bison species is unclear, though it appears to be only distantly related to the steppe and American bisons, with possibly some interbreeding between the two lineages during the Middle Pleistocene. The steppe bison survived into the early-mid Holocene in Alaska-Yukon and eastern Siberia, before becoming extinct.

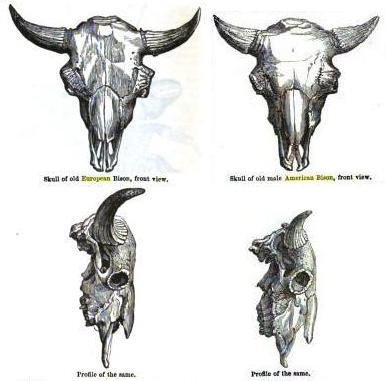
Skulls of European bison (left) and American bison (right)

Prior to the late 19th century, the population of American bison likely numbered in the tens of millions, perhaps as many as 60 million. During the population bottleneck caused by the great slaughter of American bison during the 19th century, the number of bison remaining alive in North America declined to as low as 541. During that period, a handful of ranchers gathered remnants of the existing herds to save the species from extinction. These ranchers bred some of the bison with cattle in an effort to produce "cattleo" (today called "beefalo"). Accidental crossings were also known to occur. Generally, male domestic bulls were crossed with bison cows, producing offspring of which only the females were fertile. The crossbred animals did not demonstrate any form of hybrid vigor, so the practice was abandoned. Wisent-American bison hybrids were briefly experimented with in Germany (and found to be fully fertile) and a herd of such animals is maintained in Russia. First-generation crosses do not occur naturally, requiring caesarean delivery. First-generation males are infertile. The U.S. National Bison Association has adopted a code of ethics that prohibits its members from deliberately crossbreeding bison with any other species. In the United States, many ranchers are now using DNA testing to cull the residual cattle genetics from their bison herds. The proportion of cattle DNA that has been measured in introgressed individuals and bison herds today is typically quite low, ranging from 0.56 to 1.8%.

There are also remnant purebred American bison herds on public lands in North America. Two subspecies of bison exist in North America: the plains bison and the wood bison. Herds of importance are found in Yellowstone National Park, Wind Cave National Park in South Dakota, Blue Mounds State Park in Minnesota, Elk Island National Park in Alberta, and Grasslands National Park in Saskatchewan. In 2015, a purebred herd of 350 individuals was identified on public lands in the Henry Mountains of southern Utah via genetic testing of mitochondrial and nuclear DNA. This study, published in 2015, also showed the Henry Mountains bison herd to be free of brucellosis, a bacterial disease that was imported with non-native domestic cattle to North America.

In 2021, the American Society of Mammalogists considered Bison to be a subgenus, and placed both bison species back into Bos.

Relationships of bovines based on nuclear DNA, after Sinding, et al. 2021.

- Bubalina (true buffalo)
- Bos
  - Bos primigenius +Bos taurus (aurochs and cattle)
  - - - Bos mutus (wild yak)
      - Bison
        - Bison bison (American bison)
        - Bison bonasus (European bison/wisent)
    - - Bos javanicus (banteng)
      - Bos gaurus (gaur)
      - Bos sauveli (kouprey)

== Behavior ==
A group of images by Eadweard Muybridge, set to motion to illustrate the movement of the bison

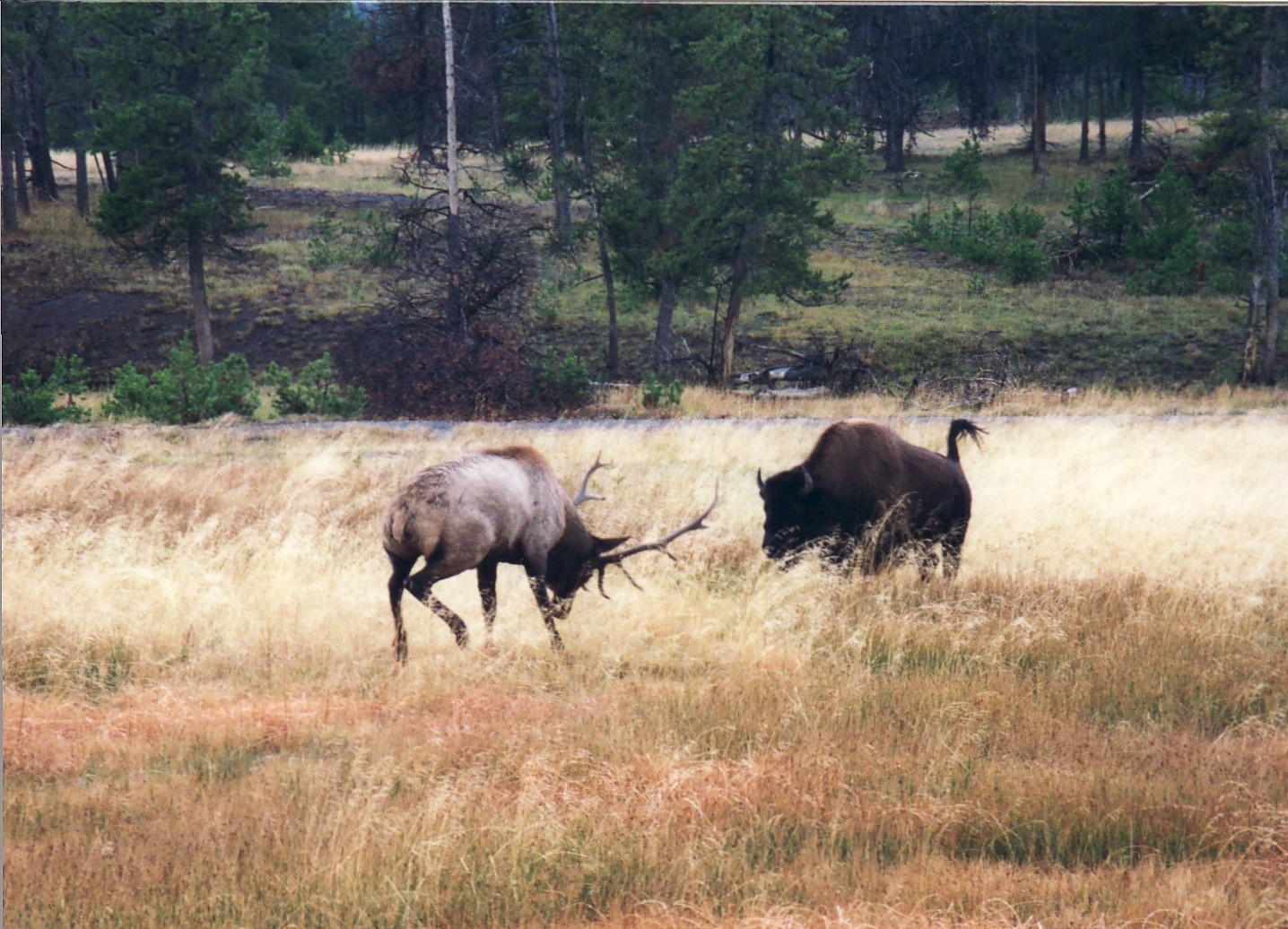
A bison charges an elk in Yellowstone National Park.

Wallowing is a common behavior of bison. A bison wallow is a shallow depression in the soil, either wet or dry. Bison roll in these depressions, covering themselves with mud or dust. Possible explanations suggested for wallowing behavior include grooming behavior associated with moulting, male-male interaction (typically rutting behavior), social behavior for group cohesion, play behavior, relief from skin irritation due to biting insects, reduction of ectoparasite load (ticks and lice), and thermoregulation. In the process of wallowing, bison may become infected by the fatal disease anthrax, which may occur naturally in the soil.

Bison temperament is often unpredictable. They usually appear peaceful, unconcerned, or even lazy, but they may attack without warning or apparent reason. They can move at speeds up to 56 km/h (35 mph) and cover long distances at a lumbering gallop.

Their most obvious weapons are the horns borne by both males and females, but their massive heads can be used as battering rams, effectively using the momentum produced by what is a typical weight of 900 to 1,200 kilograms (2,000 to 2,700 lb) moving at 50 km/h (30 mph). The hind legs can also be used to kill or maim with devastating effect. In the words of early naturalists, they were dangerous, savage animals that feared no other animal and in prime condition could best any foe except for a brown bear or a pack of wolves.

The rutting, or mating, season lasts from June through September, with peak activity in July and August. At this time, the older bulls rejoin the herd, and fights often take place between bulls. The herd exhibits much restlessness during breeding season. The animals are belligerent, unpredictable, and most dangerous.

== Habitat ==
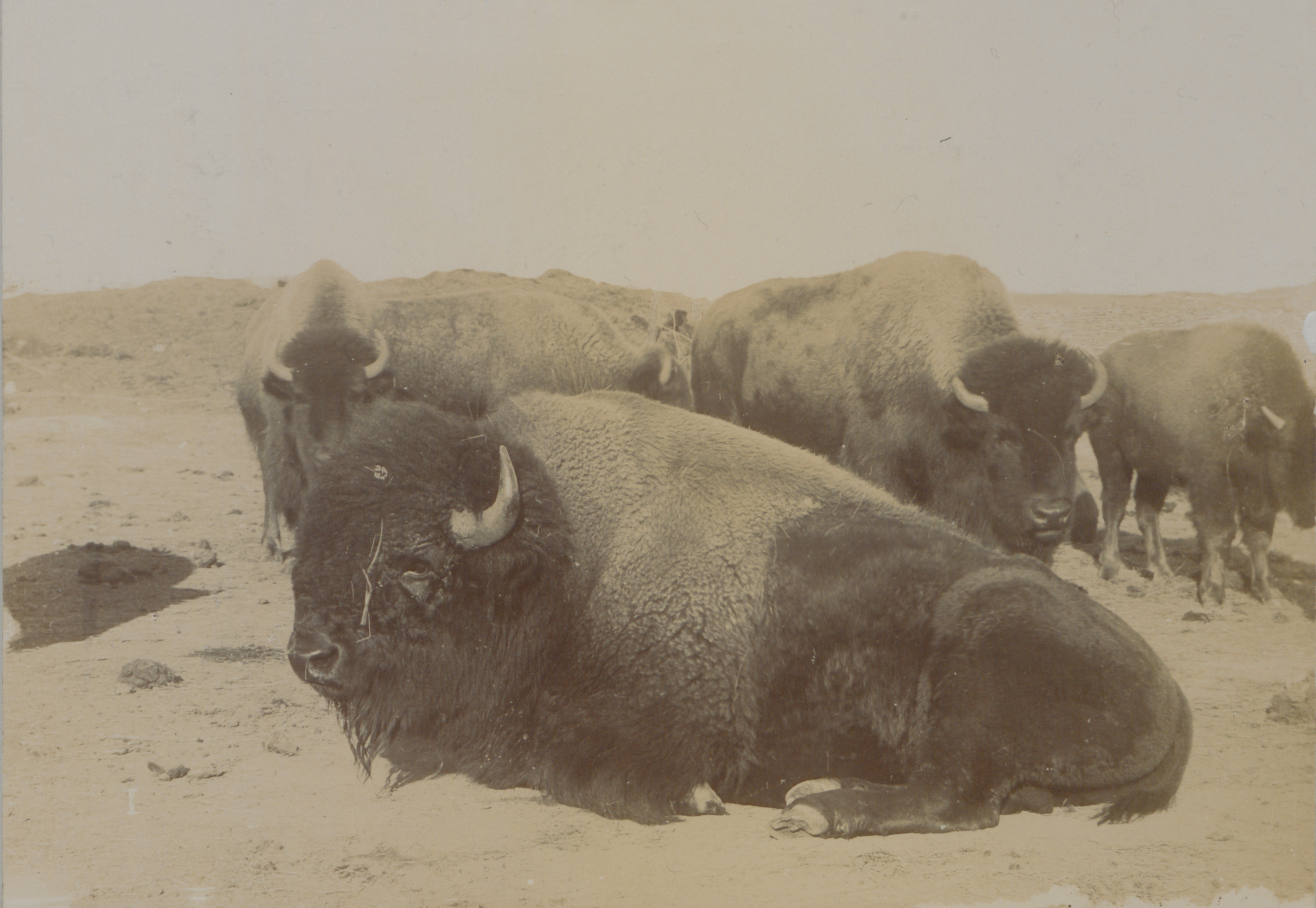
Last of the Canadian Buffaloes (1902; photograph: Steele and Company)

American bison live in river valleys and on prairies and plains. Typical habitat is open or semiopen grasslands, as well as sagebrush, semiarid lands, and scrublands. Some lightly wooded areas are also known historically to have supported bison. They also graze in hilly or mountainous areas where the slopes are not steep. Although not particularly known as high-altitude animals, bison in the Yellowstone Park bison herd are frequently found at elevations above 2,400 metres (8,000 ft). The Henry Mountains bison herd is found on the plains around the Henry Mountains, Utah, as well as in mountain valleys of the Henry Mountains to an altitude of 3,000 metres (10,000 ft).

European bison most commonly live in lightly wooded to fully wooded areas as well as areas with increased shrubs and bushes. European bison can sometimes be found living on grasslands and plains as well. A herd of cattle-wisent crossbreeds (zubron) is maintained in Poland and Slovakia, specifically in the Carpathian Mountains within Poloniny National Park.

=== Restrictions ===
Throughout most of their historical range, landowners have sought restrictions on free-ranging bison. Herds on private land are required to be fenced in.

In the state of Montana, free-ranging bison on public land are legally shot, due to transmission of disease to cattle and damage to public property.

In 2013, Montana legislative measures concerning the bison were proposed and passed, but opposed by Native American tribes as they impinged on sovereign tribal rights. Three such bills were vetoed by Steve Bullock, the former governor of Montana. The bison's circumstances remain an issue of contention between Native American tribes and private landowners.

== Diet ==
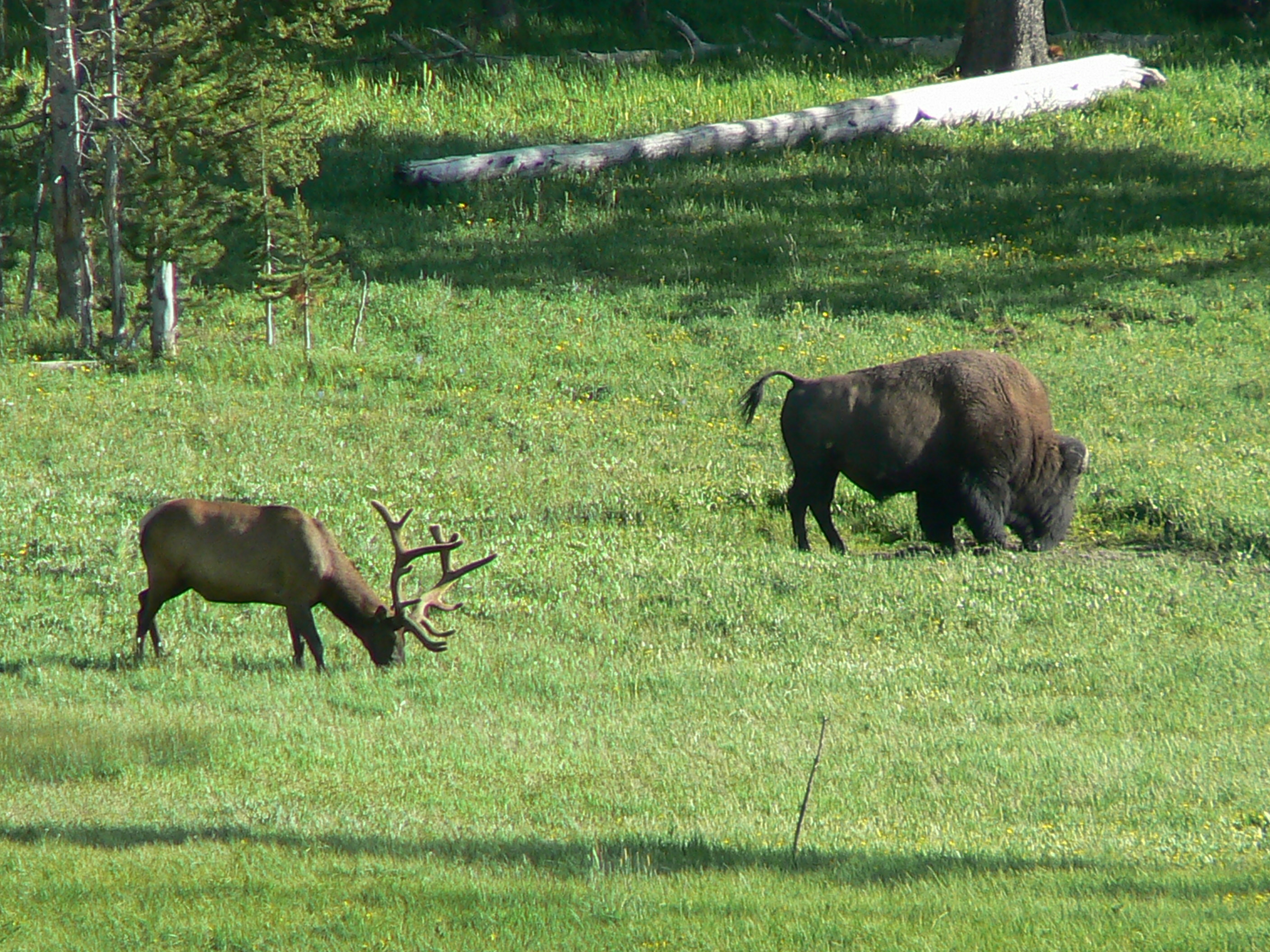
A bison and a bull elk grazing together in Yellowstone National Park

Bison are ruminants, able to ferment cellulose in a specialized stomach prior to digestion. Bison were once thought to almost exclusively consume grasses and sedges, but are now known to consume a wide-variety of plants including woody plants and herbaceous eudicots. Over the course of the year, bison shift which plants they select in their diet based on which plants have the highest protein or energy concentrations at a given time and will reliably consume the same species of plants across years. Protein concentrations of the plants they eat tend to be highest in the spring and decline thereafter, reaching their lowest in the winter. In Yellowstone National Park, bison browsed willows and cottonwoods, not only in the winter when few other plants are available, but also in the summer. Bison are thought to migrate to optimize their diet, and will concentrate their feeding on recently burned areas due to the higher quality forage that regrows after the burn. Wisent tend to browse on shrubs and low-hanging trees more often than do the American bison, which prefer grass to shrubbery and trees.

== Reproduction ==
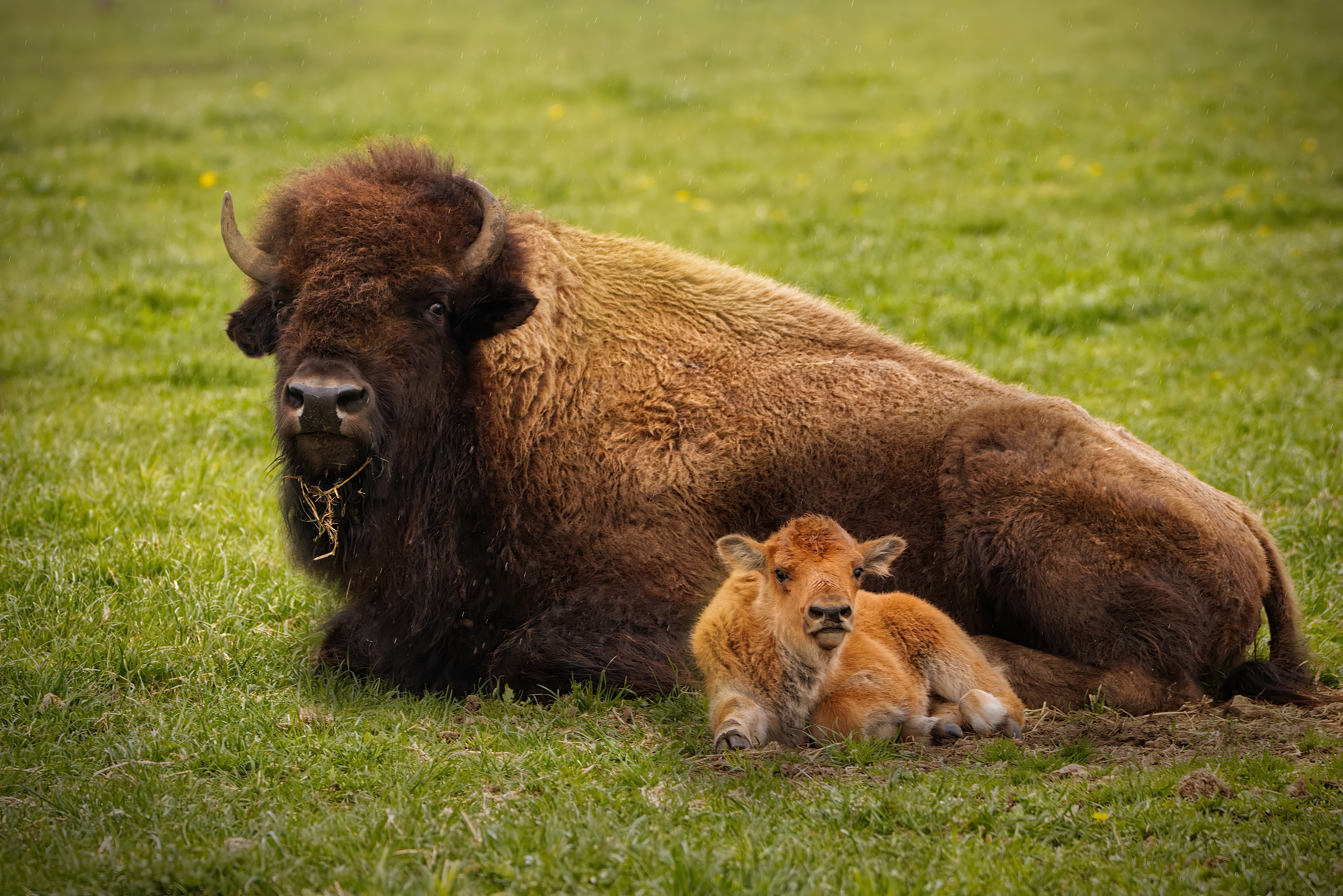
A bison calf resting with its mother

Female bison ("cows") typically reproduce after three years of age and can continue beyond 19 years of age. Cows produce calves annually as long as their nutrition is sufficient, but not after years when weight gain is low. Reproduction is dependent on a cow's mass and age. Heavier cows produce heavier calves (weighed in the fall at weaning), and weights of calves are lower for older cows (after age 8).

== Predators ==
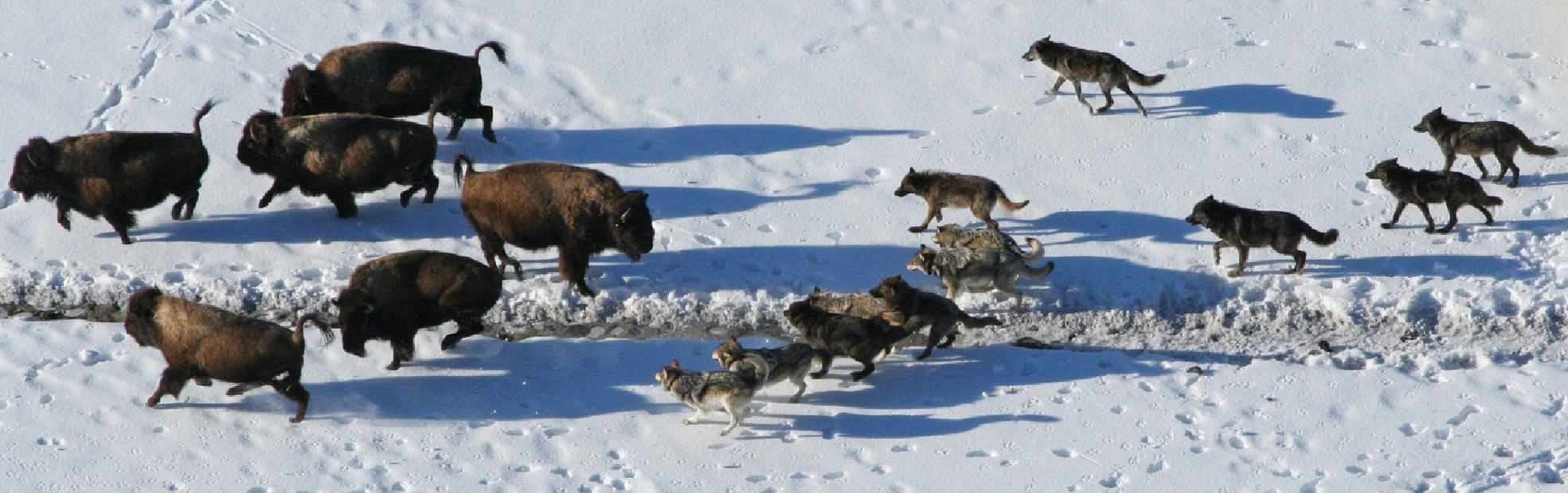
Wolves hunting bison in Yellowstone National Park

Owing to their size, bison have few predators. Five exceptions are humans, grey wolves, cougars, grizzly bears, and coyotes. Wolves generally take down a bison while in a pack, but cases of a single wolf killing bison have been reported. Grizzly bears also consume bison, often by driving off the pack and consuming the wolves' kill. Grizzly bears and coyotes also prey on bison calves. Historically and prehistorically, lions, cave lions, tigers, dire wolves, Smilodon, Homotherium, cave hyenas, and Neanderthals posed threats to bison.

== Infections and illness ==
For American bison, a main illness is malignant catarrhal fever, though brucellosis is a serious concern in the Yellowstone Park bison herd. Bison in the Antelope Island bison herd are regularly inoculated against brucellosis, parasites, Clostridium infection, infectious bovine rhinotracheitis, and bovine vibriosis.

The major illnesses in European bison are foot-and-mouth disease and balanoposthitis. Inbreeding of a small population plays a role in a number of genetic defects and lowers immunity to disease; that poses greater risk to the population. Male European bison are also at risk of the incurable and often fatal disease posthitis which is seen as a large threat to the remaining population of wild European bison.

== Name ==
The name 'bison' was first used for the European species— ancient Greek authors Pausanias and Oppian in 2nd-century AD wrote about them in Greek as βίσων bisōn; so did Roman authors Pliny the Elder and Gaius Julius Solinus (as Latin bĭson). The Germanic name 'wisent' is a cognate, meaning that the two words share a common origin. The Latin bĭson was made into a genus name by Charles Hamilton Smith in 1827.

Although called "buffalo" in American English, they are only distantly related to two "true buffalo", the Asian water buffalo and the African buffalo. Samuel de Champlain applied the French term buffle to the bison in 1616 (published 1619), after seeing skins and a drawing shown to him by members of the Nipissing First Nation, who said they travelled 40 days (from east of Lake Huron) to trade with another nation who hunted the animals. Though "bison" might be considered more scientifically correct, "buffalo" is also considered correct as a result of standard usage in American English, and is listed in many dictionaries as an acceptable name for American buffalo or bison. "Buffalo" has a longer history in English than "bison", which was first recorded in 1774.

== Bison and human culture ==
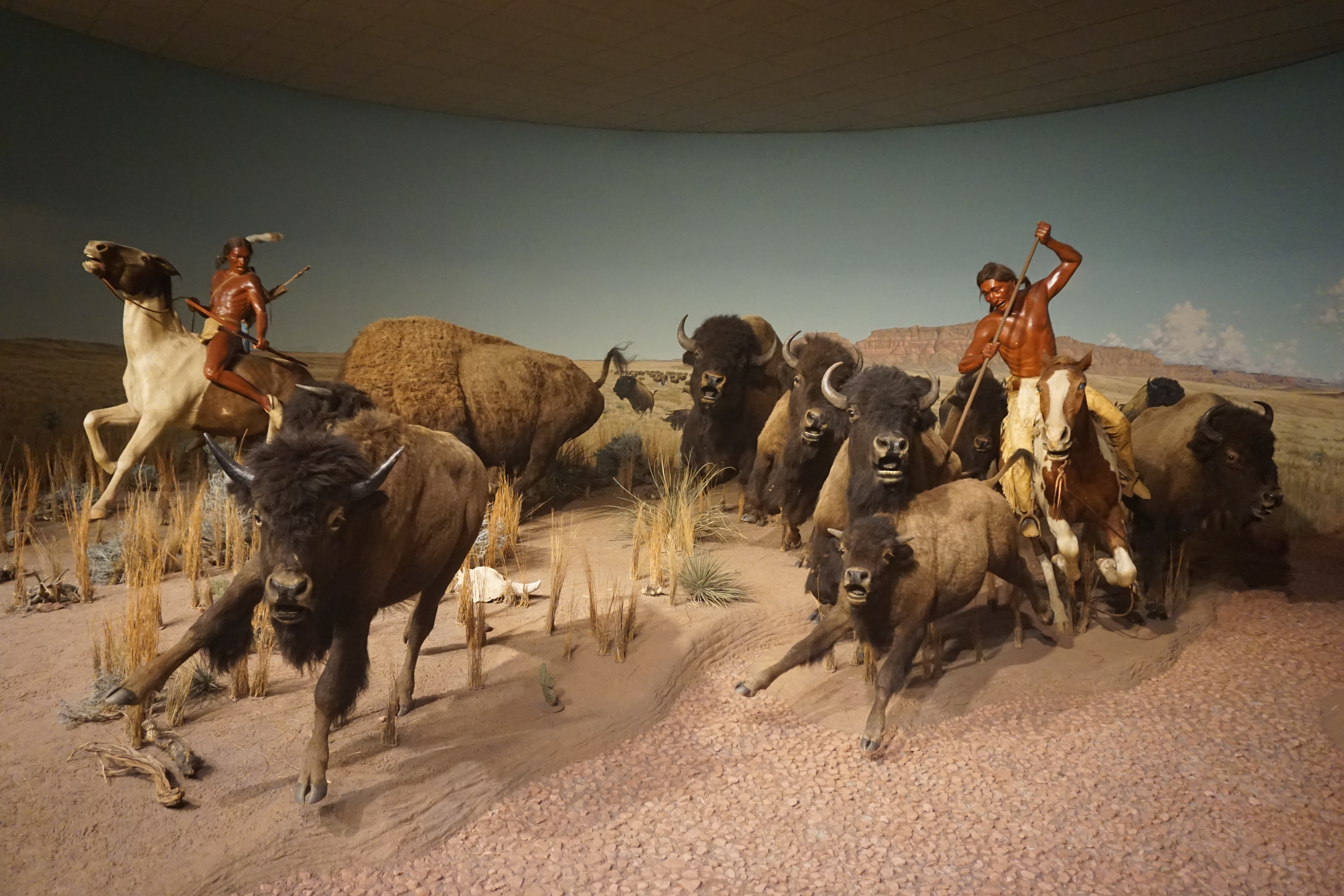
Photo of a Native American Bison Hunt diorama located at the Milwaukee Public Museum in Wisconsin

Bison were a significant resource for Indigenous peoples of North America for food and raw materials until near extinction in the late 19th century. For the Indigenous peoples of the Plains, it was their principal food source. Native Americans highly valued their relationship with the bison and saw them as sacred, treating them respectfully to ensure their abundance and longevity. In his biography, Lakota teacher and elder John Fire Lame Deer describes the relationship as such:

The buffalo gave us everything we needed. Without it we were nothing. Our tipis were made of his skin. His hide was our bed, our blanket, our winter coat. It was our drum, throbbing through the night, alive, holy. Out of his skin we made our water bags. His flesh strengthened us, became flesh of our flesh. Not the smallest part of it was wasted. His stomach, a red-hot stone dropped into it, became our soup kettle. His horns were our spoons, the bones our knives, our women's awls and needles. Out of his sinews we made our bowstrings and thread. His ribs were fashioned into sleds for our children, his hoofs became rattles. His mighty skull, with the pipe leaning against it, was our sacred altar. The name of the greatest of all Sioux was Tatanka Iyotake—Sitting Bull. When you killed off the buffalo you also killed the Indian—the real, natural, "wild" Indian.

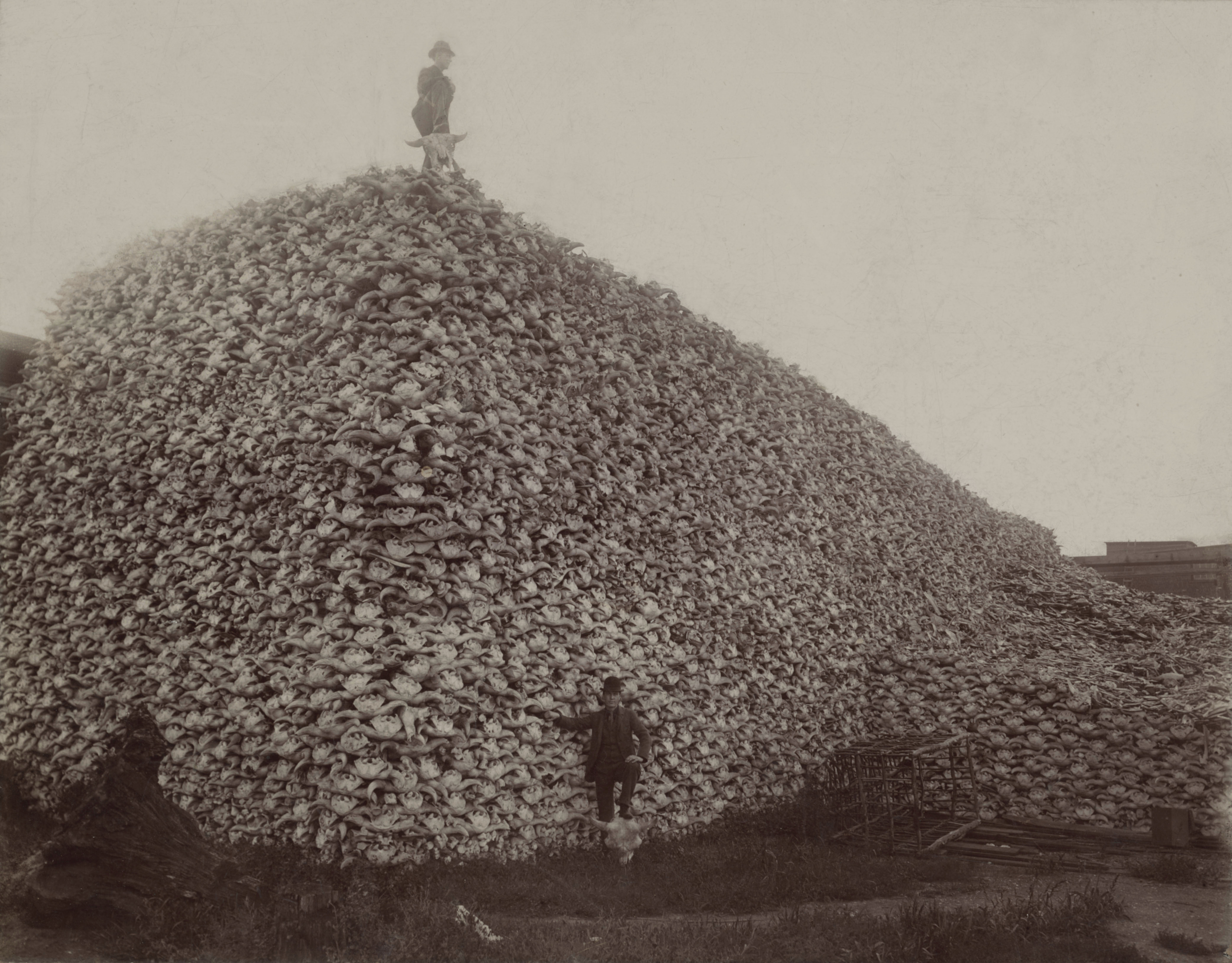
Photo from 1892 of a pile of American bison skulls waiting to be ground for fertilizer

European colonials were almost exclusively accountable for the near-extinction of the American bison in the 19th century. At the beginning of the century, tens of millions of bison roamed North America. Colonists slaughtered an estimated 50 million bison during the 19th century, although the causes of decline and the numbers killed are disputed and debated. Railroads were advertising "hunting by rail", where trains encountered large herds alongside or crossing the tracks. Men aboard fired from the train's roof or windows, leaving countless animals to rot where they died. This overhunting was in part motivated by the U.S. government's desire to limit the range and power of Indigenous plains peoples whose diets and cultures depended on the buffalo herds. The overhunting of the bison reduced their population to hundreds.

The American bison's nadir came in 1889, with an estimated population of only 1,091 animals (both wild and captive). Repopulation attempts via enforced protection of government herds and extensive ranching began in 1910 and have continued (with excellent success) to the present day, with some caveats. Extensive farming has increased the bison's population to nearly 150,000, and it is officially no longer considered an endangered species. However, from a genetic standpoint, most of these animals are actually hybrids with domestic cattle and only two populations in Yellowstone National Park in the United States and Elk Island National Park in Canada remain as genetically pure bison. These genetically pure animals account for only ~5% of the currently extant American bison population, reflecting the loss of most of the species' genetic diversity.

As of July 2015, an estimated 4,900 bison lived in Yellowstone National Park, the largest U.S. bison population on public land. During 1983–1985 visitors experienced 33 bison-related injuries (range = 10–13/year), so the park implemented education campaigns. After years of success, five injuries associated with bison encounters occurred in 2015, because visitors did not maintain the required distance of 75 ft (23 m) from bison while hiking or taking pictures.

== Livestock ==
The earliest plausible accounts of captive bison are those of the zoo at Tenochtitlan, the Aztec capital, which held an animal the Spaniards called "the Mexican bull". In 1552, Francisco Lopez de Gomara described Plains Indians herding and leading bison like cattle in his controversial book, Historia general de las Indias. Gomara, having never visited the Americas himself, likely misinterpreted early ethnographic accounts as the more familiar pastoralist relationship of the Old World. Today, bison are increasingly raised for meat, hides, and wool products. The majority of bison in the world are raised for human consumption or fur clothing. Bison meat is generally considered to taste very similar to beef, but is lower in fat and cholesterol, yet higher in protein than beef. A market even exists for kosher bison meat; these bison are slaughtered at one of the few kosher mammal slaughterhouses in the U.S. and Canada, and the meat is then distributed worldwide. Beefalo have been advertised as a hybrid breed between bison and cattle, but many beefalo, including the original pedigree founding herd of the breed, have no detectable bison ancestry.

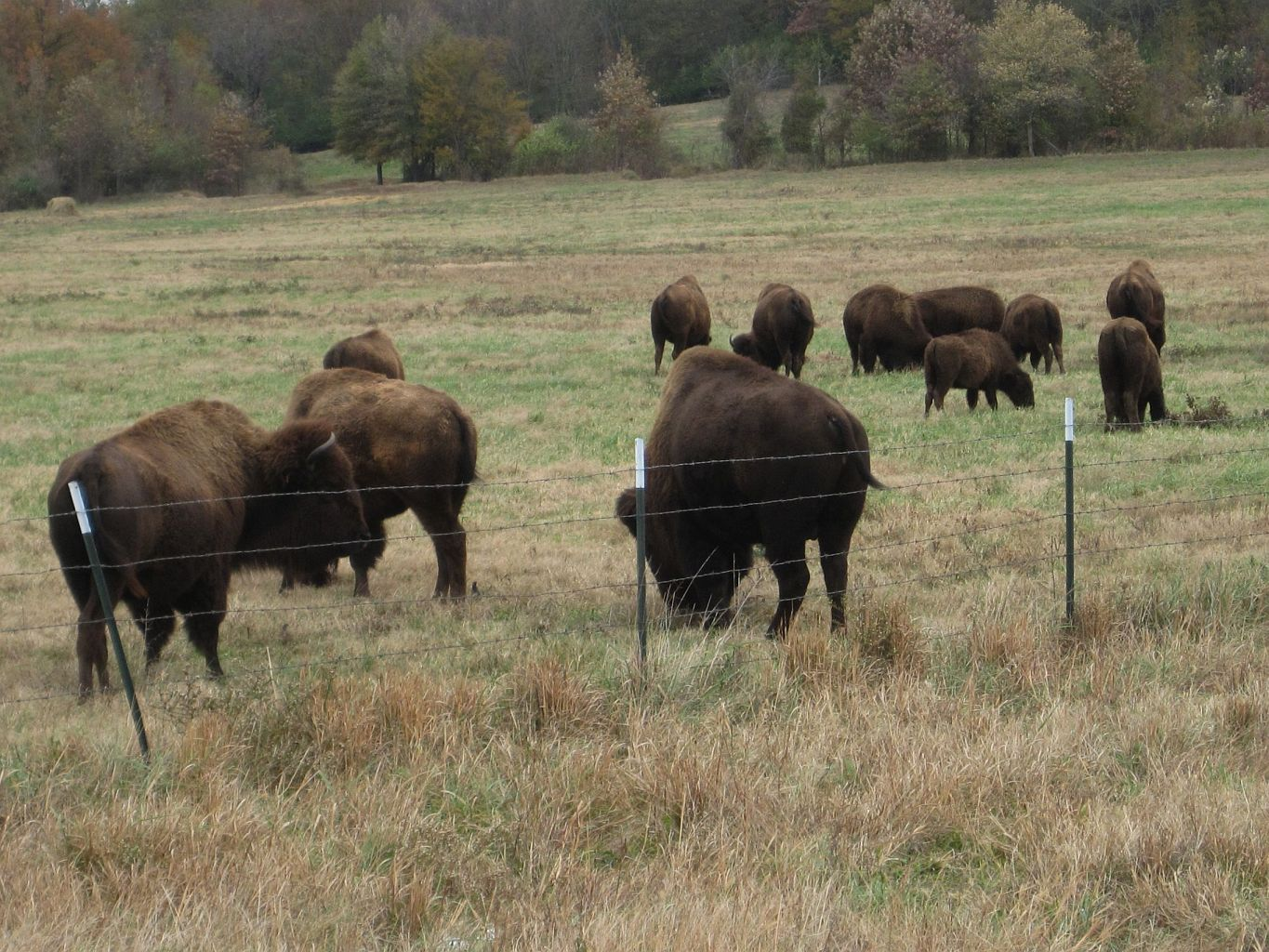
Bison ranch at the Shelby Farms Park in Memphis, Tennessee, USA, 2013.

In the United States, the commercial industry for bison has been slow to develop despite individuals, such as Ted Turner, who have long marketed bison meat. In the 1990s, Turner found limited success with restaurants for high-quality cuts of meat, which include bison steaks and tenderloin. Lower-quality cuts suitable for hamburger and hot dogs have been described as "almost nonexistent". This created a marketing problem for commercial farming because the majority of usable meat, about 400 pounds for each bison, is suitable for these products. In 2003, the United States Department of Agriculture purchased $10 million worth of frozen overstock to save the industry, which would later recover through better use of consumer marketing. Restaurants have played a role in popularizing bison meat, like Ted's Montana Grill, which added bison to their menus. Ruby Tuesday first offered bison on their menus in 2005.

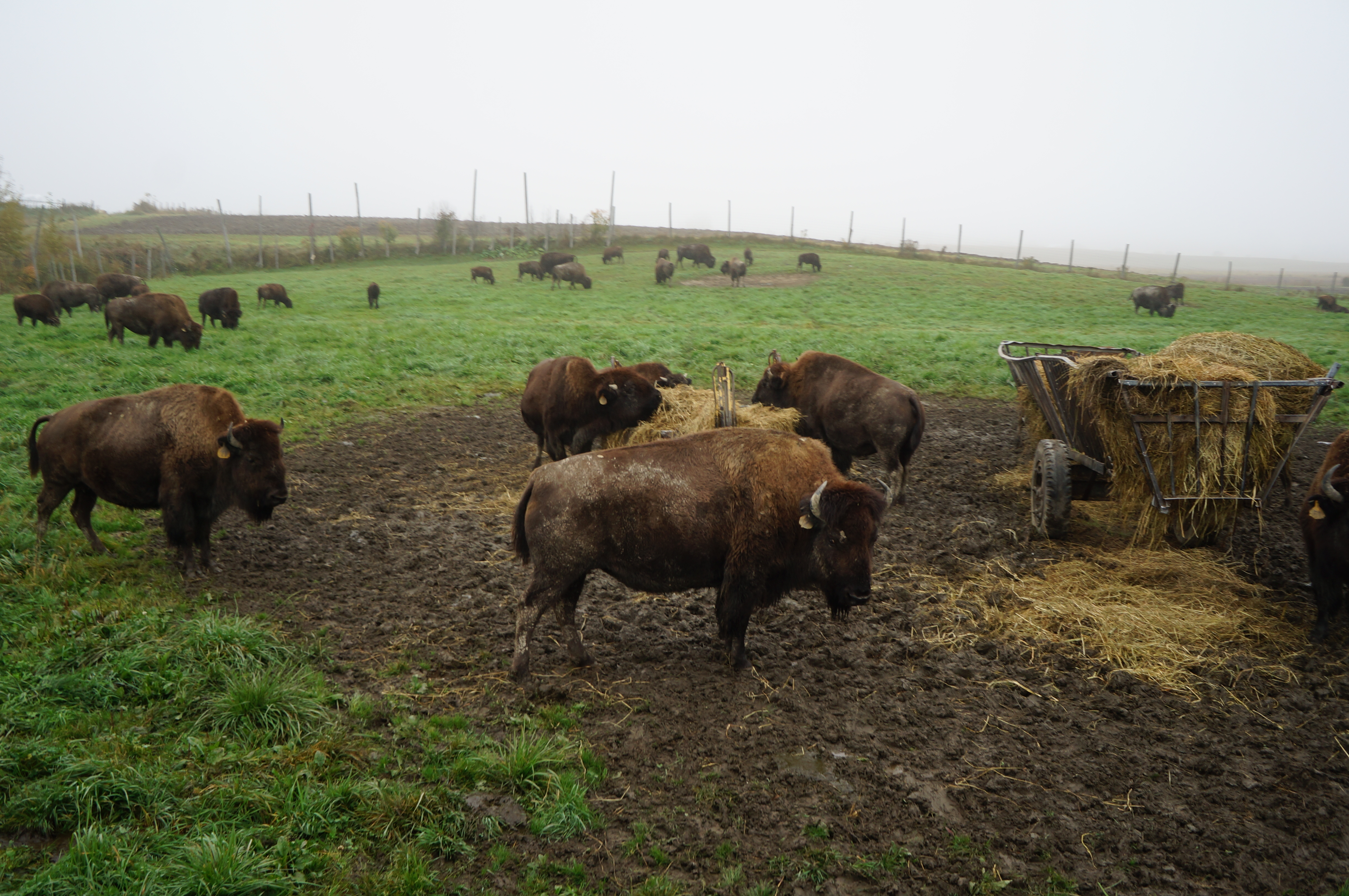
Bison farm at Saint-Prosper-de-Champlain in Quebec, 2017.

In Canada, commercial bison farming began in the mid-1980s, concerning an unknown number of animals then. The first census of the bison occurred in 1996, which recorded 45,235 bison on 745 farms, and grew to 195,728 bison on 1,898 farms for the 2006 census.

Several pet food companies use bison as a red meat alternative in dog foods. The companies producing these formulas include Natural Balance Pet Foods, Freshpet, the Blue Buffalo Company, Solid Gold, Canidae, and Taste of the Wild (made by Diamond Pet Foods, Inc., owned by Schell and Kampeter, Inc.).

== See also ==
- Bison hunting
- Gaur
- National Bison Day (1 November in the United States)
- Yellowstone Park bison herd

== Bibliography ==
- Boyd, Delaney P. (2003). Conservation of North American bison: Status and recommendations (PDF) (Thesis). doi:10.11575/PRISM/22701. hdl:1880/40230. OCLC 232117310.
- Cunfer, Geoff; Waiser, Bill (2016). Bison and People on the North American Great Plains: A Deep Environmental History. Texas A&M University Press. ISBN 978-1-62349-474-2.
- Halbert, N. D.; Derr, J. N. (7 December 2006). "A Comprehensive Evaluation of Cattle Introgression into US Federal Bison Herds". Journal of Heredity. 98 (1): 1–12. doi:10.1093/jhered/esl051. PMID 17172633.
- Nesheim, David A (2012). "Profit, Preservation, and Shifting Definitions of Bison in American". Environmental History. 17 (3): 547–77. doi:10.1093/envhis/ems048.
- Ward, T. J.; Bielawski, J. P.; Davis, S. K.; Templeton, J. W.; Derr, J. N. (1999). "Identification of Domestic Cattle Hybrids in Wild Cattle and Bison Species: A General Approach Using mtDNA Markers and the Parametric Bootstrap". Animal Conservation. 2 (1): 51–57. Bibcode:1999AnCon...2...51W. doi:10.1111/j.1469-1795.1999.tb00048.x.
