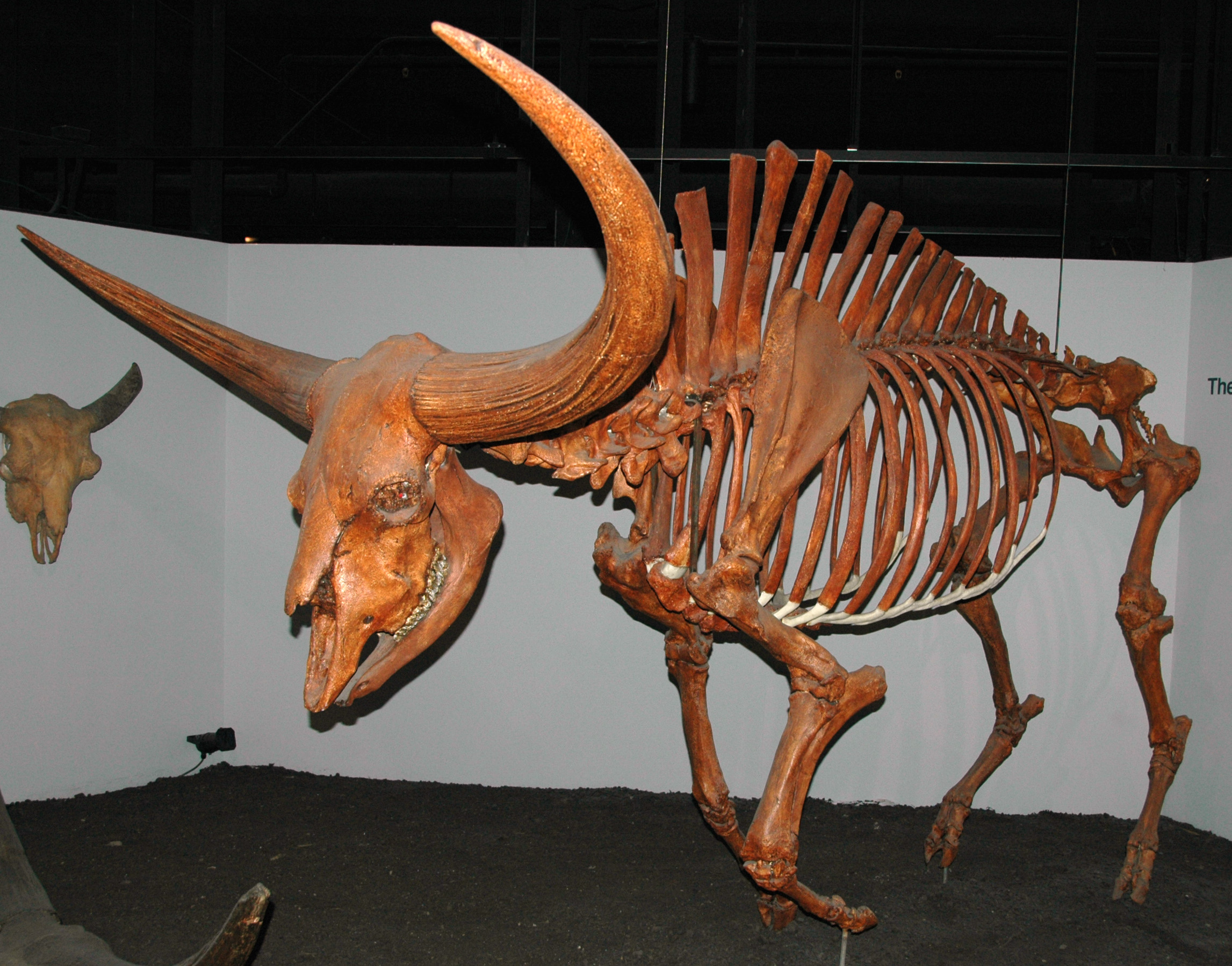
- Bison latifrons skeleton

Scientific classification
- Kingdom: Animalia
- Phylum: Chordata
- Class: Mammalia
- Order: Artiodactyla
- Family: Bovidae
- Subfamily: Bovinae
- Genus: Bos
- Subgenus: Bison
- Species: †B. latifrons

Binomial name
- †Bison latifrons Harlan, 1825

= Bison latifrons =

Bison latifrons Temporal range: Late Pleistocene

Extinct species of mammal

Bison latifrons, also known as the giant bison or long-horned bison, is an extinct species of bison that lived in North America during the Late Pleistocene epoch ranging from southern Canada to Mexico. It is noted for its large body size and distinctive long horns.

== Evolution ==
The ultimate ancestor of all American bison species, the steppe bison (Bison priscus), first entered northwest North America (eastern Beringia, comprising Alaska and Yukon) around 195,000–135,000 years ago during the Penultimate Glacial Period (Illinoian), and then entered central North America at the beginning of the Last Interglacial (Sangamonian) around 130,000 years ago, following the melting of the Laurentide Ice Sheet, with a B. priscus population subsequently evolving into B. latifrons. The earliest fossil B. latifrons, as well as one of the oldest well-dated bison specimens in central North America, is from the Snowmass site in Colorado, dating to around 120,000 years ago. A population of B. latifrons has been suggested to have given rise to Bison antiquus, the ancestor of modern American bison before 60,000 years ago, with the two species co-existing alongside each other.

== Description ==
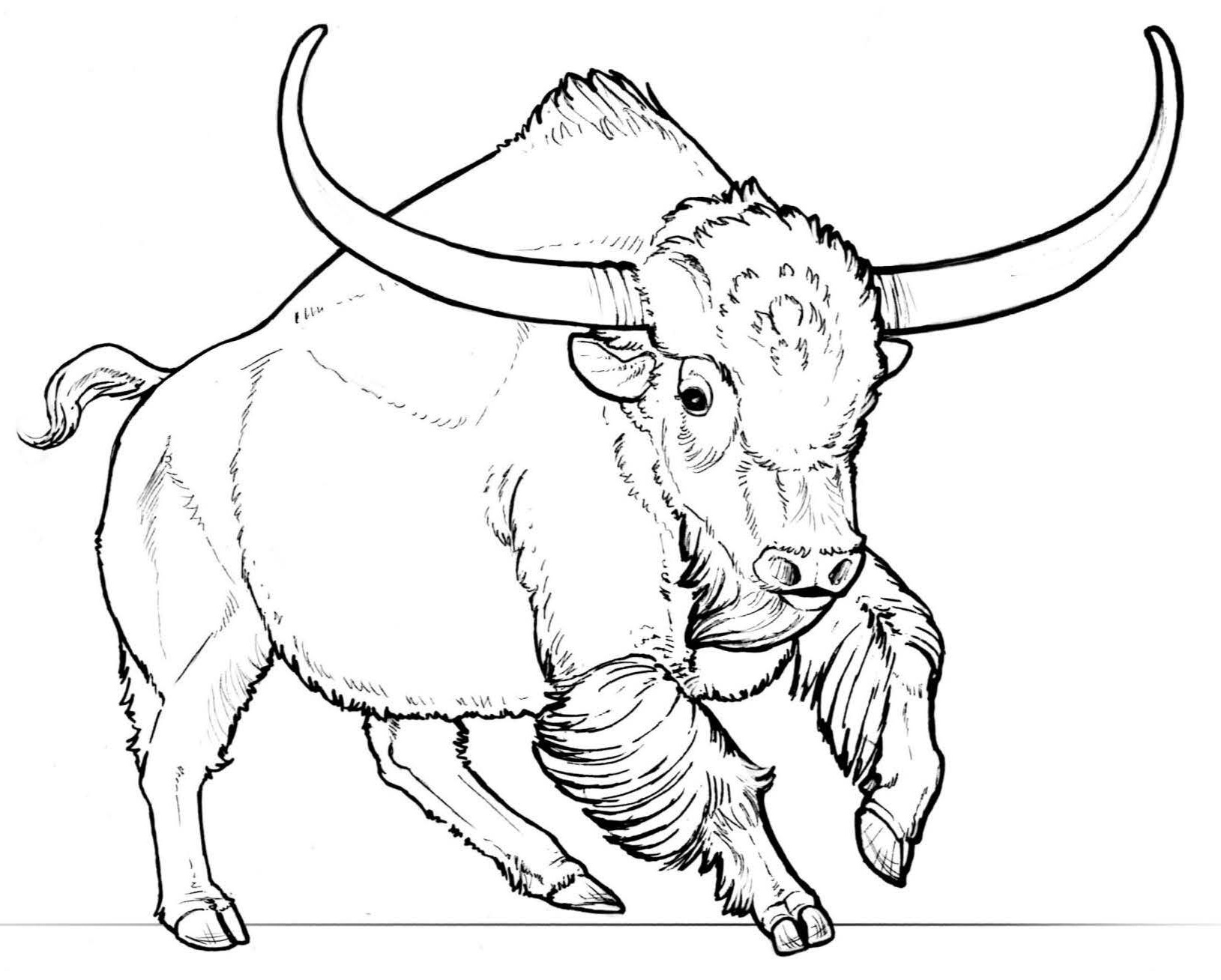
Life restoration

Because only skulls and horns of this species have been found well preserved, the size of B. latifrons is currently not clearly known. Based on leg bones, the mass of B. latifrons has been estimated to be 25-50% larger than that of modern B. bison, making it undoubtedly one of the largest-ever ruminants.

The known dimensions of the species are on average larger than any extinct and extant bovids, including both the American bison and the European bison, making it the largest known bovid. Overall, it was probably around 4.75 m (15.6 ft) in length and stood about 2.3 m (7.5 ft) or up to 2.5 m (8.2 ft) tall at the withers. With an estimated weight of 1,250 kg (2,760 lb), or possibly over 2,000 kg (4,400 lb) in very large males. The horns of B. latifrons measured as great as 213 cm (84 in) from tip to tip, compared with 66 cm (26 in) to 90 cm (35 in) in modern Bison bison.

== Habitat and behavior ==
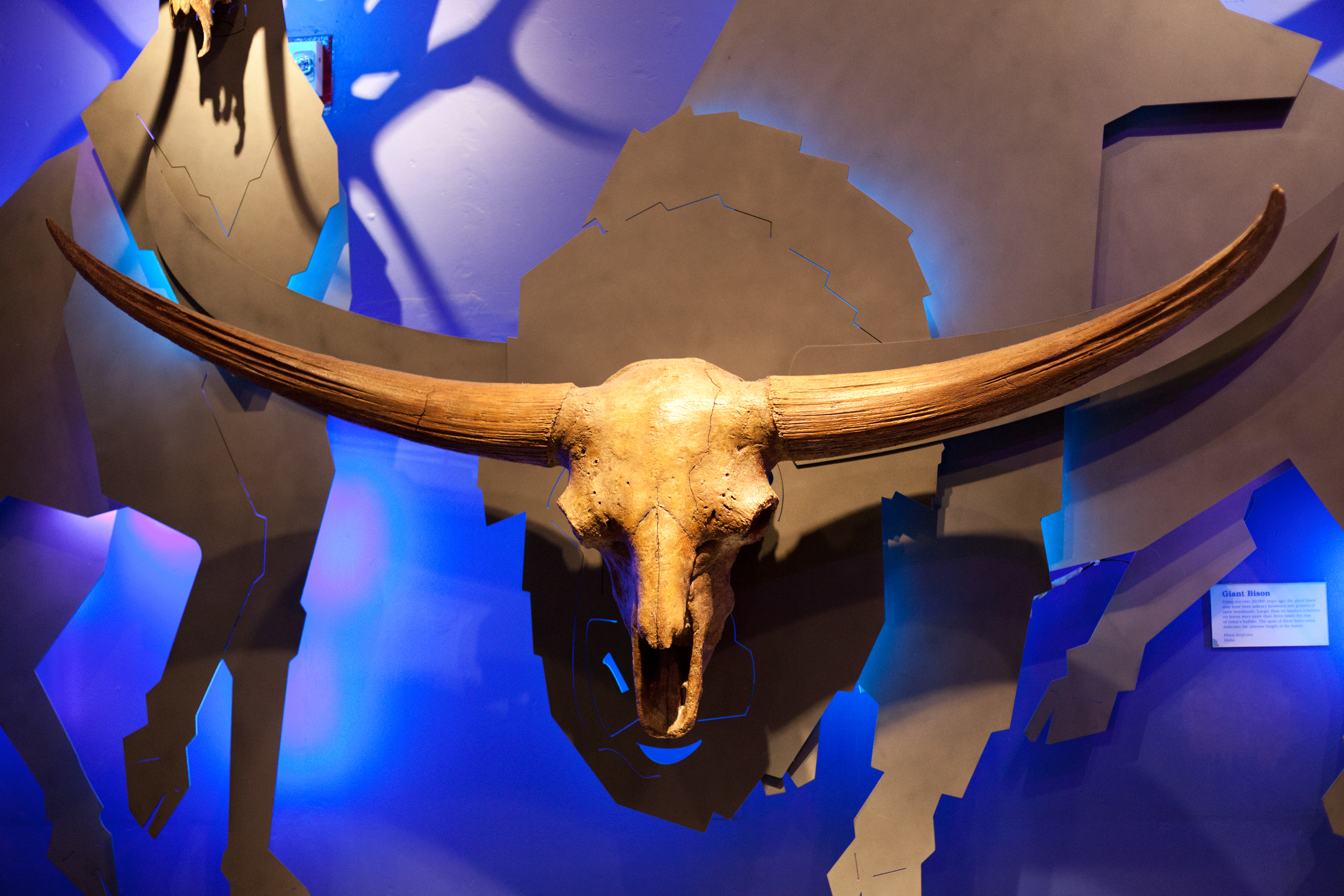
Skull at the Royal Tyrrell Museum in Drumheller, Alberta, Canada

Bison latifrons ranged across much of North America, extending from southern Mexico to southern Canada, as far west as California and as far east as Florida and the American Midwest. Though it was primarily a grazer, B. latifrons exhibited a high degree of dietary flexibility and adaptability across its range. Isotopic analysis from specimens found in Florida suggests a largely grazing based diet, while isotopic analysis of specimens from Clark Quarry, Georgia, suggest that these specimens had a mixed feeding diet (both browsing and grazing), with their diet varying according to the seasons.

== Extinction ==
While many studies have suggested that B. latifrons went extinct around or before 20,000 years ago, a 2022 study reported remains from South Texas dating to around 13,000 years BP. Pressure from human hunting may have played a role in the extinction of B. latifrons.
