= Hotel Baxter =

Building in Bozeman, Montana, US

- U.S. National Register of Historic Places
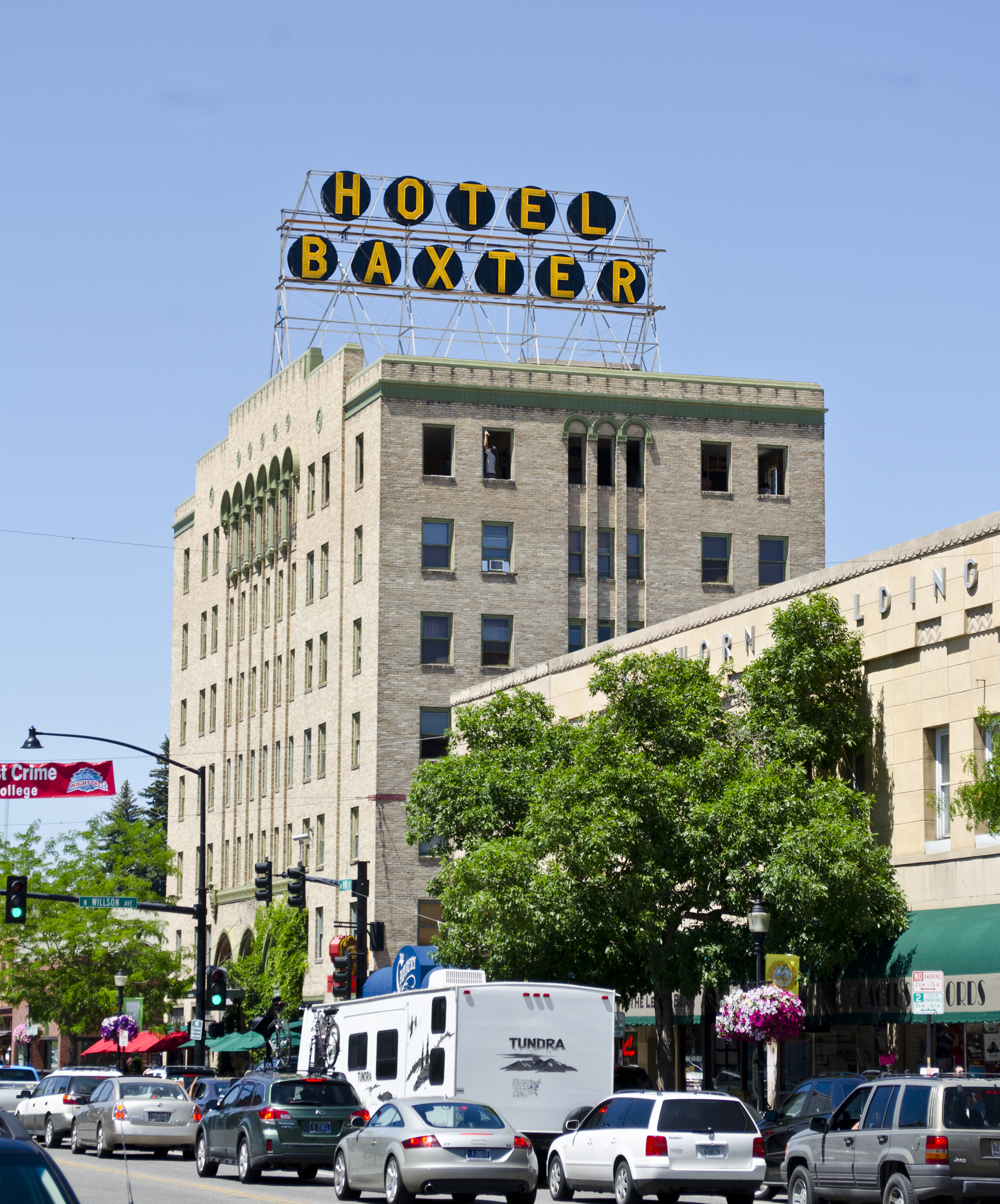
- Hotel Baxter in 2013

- Location within Montana Location within the United States
- Location: 105 W. Main St., Bozeman, Montana
- Coordinates: 45°40′46″N 111°4′37″W
- Area: less than one acre
- Built: 1929
- Architect: H. J. Hamill; Fred F. Willson
- Website: www.thebaxterhotel.com
- NRHP reference No.: 84002469
- Added to NRHP: April 19, 1984

The Hotel Baxter, popularly called the Baxter or Baxter Hotel, is a seven-story hotel built in 1929 in the Main Street historic district of Bozeman, Montana. Designed in Art Deco style by architect Fred F. Willson, it opened for business on March 2, 1929. The grand opening party was held Saturday, March 16, 1929. The hotel is named after George Baxter, a prominent Gallatin County rancher who provided much of the funding. It originally contained 76 rooms, two bars, and restaurant facilities. An ornate lobby on the main floor includes a small water fountain. The mezzanine level features a large ballroom. Its upper floors today contain about 20 condominium-style residences, mostly one and two-bedroom apartments. Ted's Montana Grill and the Bacchus Pub are on the ground floor.

== Renovations ==
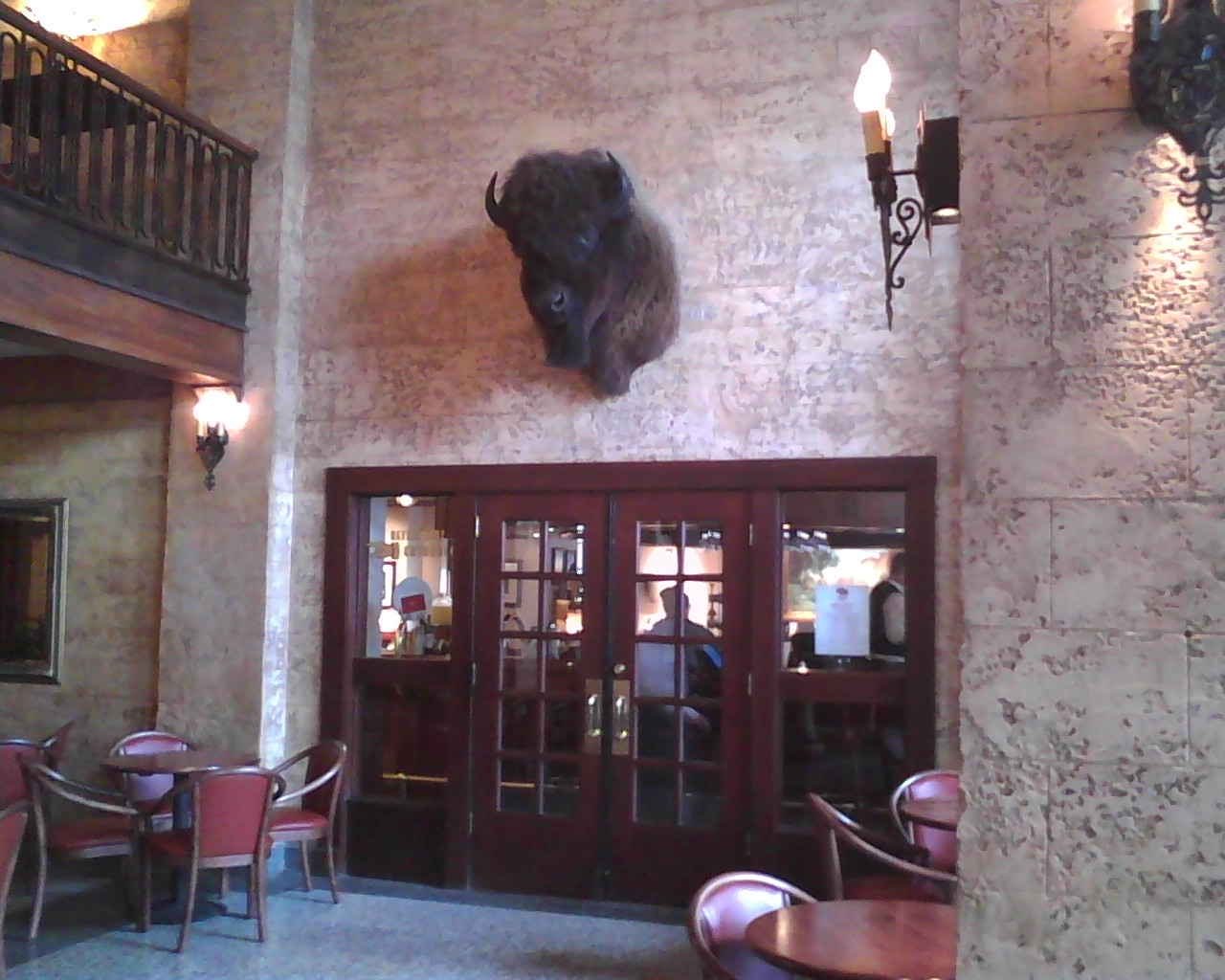
Baxter lobby, looking into the bar of Ted's Montana Grill

In the 1970s, an initial round of renovations to the first floor upgraded the historic Bacchus Pub and added a fine dining Italian-style restaurant. In 1982, a new owner renovated the entire hotel and converted the upper floors to residential condominiums. After some years of decline and a series of owners, in 2004, David Loseff, a private equity investor and part-time Bozeman resident of 14 years, obtained a majority share in the building from a previous owner who had obtained the building in 1999. Loseff took over management and began a new round of renovations to the hotel. He initially brought in live music, upgraded the Robin Lounge (now the bar of Ted's), and operated a casual restaurant while locating new tenants to run the restaurant and the Bacchus Pub. Ultimately, Ted's Montana Grill, owned by media mogul Ted Turner, opened in June 2008. To accommodate the new venture, the old restaurant space as well as the former Robin Lounge were remodeled and reconfigured, so that Ted's now encompasses 4,800 square feet (450 m^{2}). The Bacchus Pub, an institution throughout the history of the hotel, had been closed for almost four years, but was renovated and reopened under its current management in December 2008.

== The Bacchus Pub ==
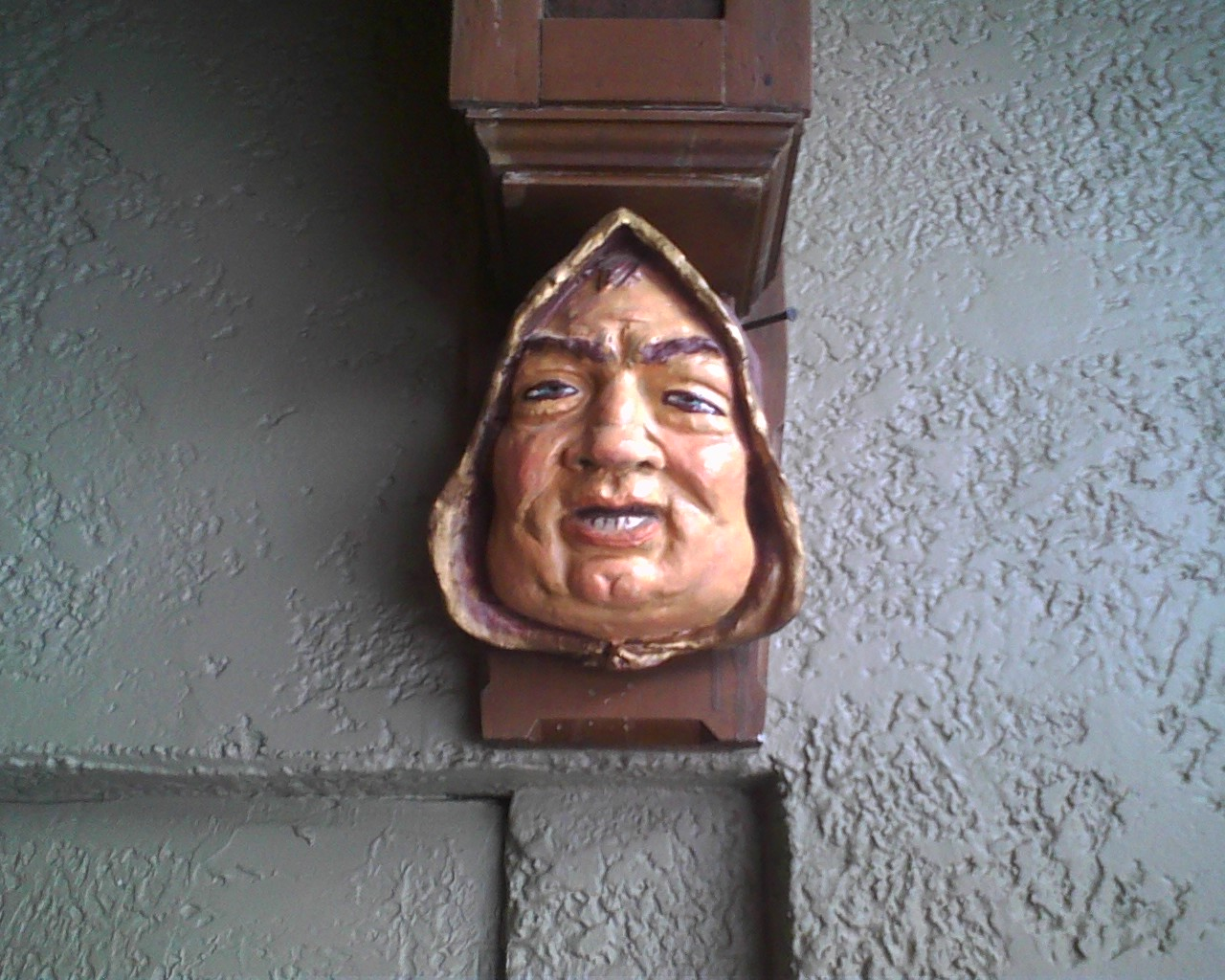
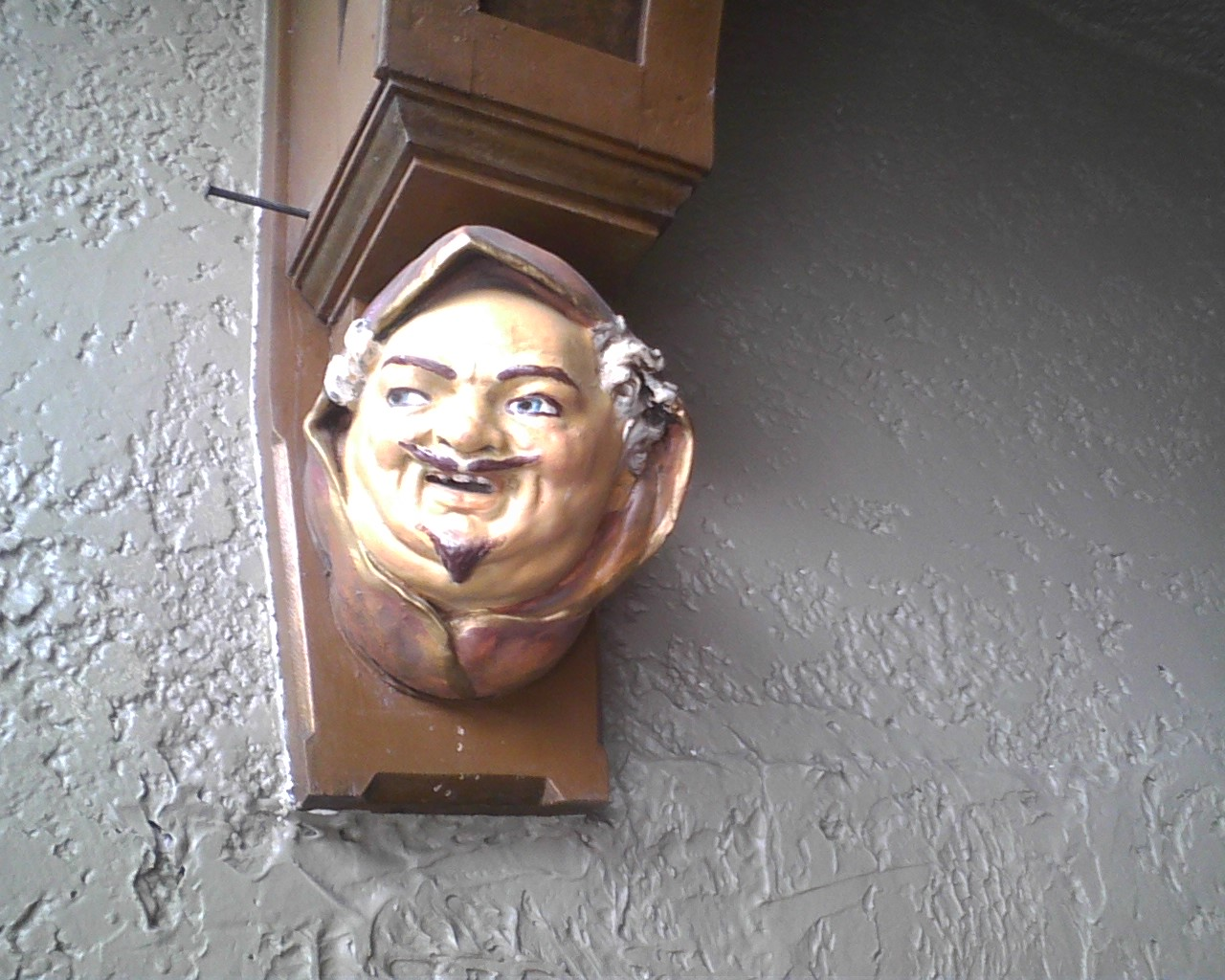
Detail of Monk's heads which adorn the walls of the Bacchus Pub. Carvings alleged to be of actual monks who operated a beer brewery in Europe

The Bacchus Pub, designed with a medieval European decor, features unique carved, painted heads of monks that line the walls and center beam of the ceiling, as well as stained glass originally designed for the business. It operated continuously under a series of changing owners and themes for 30 years. The facility was closed from 2005 until 2008, when the current owners agreed to operate under its traditional name and concept. The space had mostly been a pub that served food and beverages, but had also been operated as a Mexican restaurant and a small Italian grille in intervening years. The new owners of the Baxter building turned down offers for various themes and held out for a tenant who was willing to restore the original pub design and atmosphere. After the business reopened, a brief legal squabble ensued over the legal ownership of the "Bacchus Pub" name, which had been purchased by another local restaurant owner, but a settlement was soon reached, allowing the pub to operate under its original name at its original location.

== Unique features ==
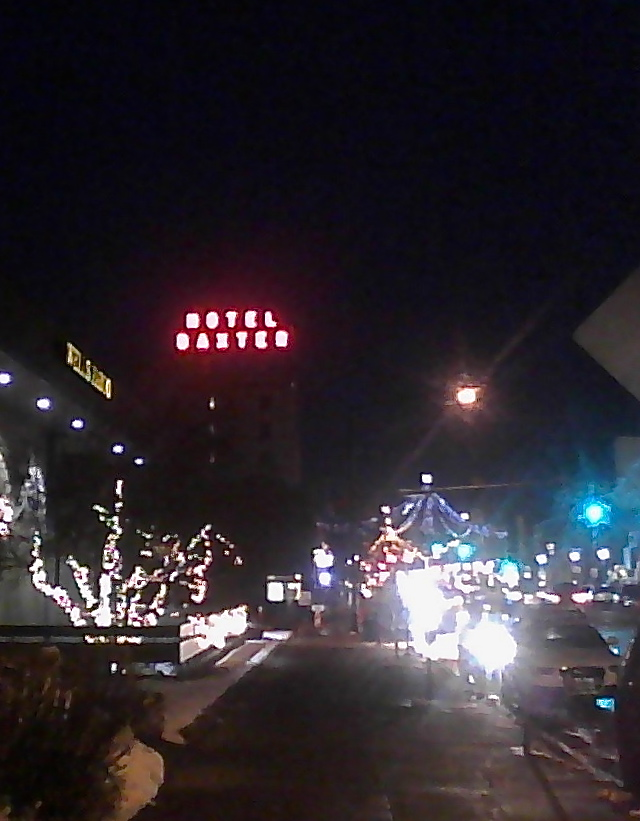
Illuminated sign atop the Hotel

Unique features of the Baxter building include a 32-foot high by 45-foot wide electric "Hotel Baxter" sign on the roof. Erected when the building was completed in 1929, it was intended to be seen from the top of mountain passes up to 70 miles away to "serve as a beacon for travelers." The red neon sign was nonfunctional for about 40 years, but was refurbished, repaired, and officially re-lit on January 10, 2013, in a ceremony, where U.S. Senator and part-time Bozeman resident Max Baucus called it "A crown jewel of Bozeman." However, a researcher at Montana State University has raised concerns about light pollution, generating some local controversy. The roof of the building also features a flashing blue light, which is turned on throughout the winter to alert local skiers when new snow is falling at the Bridger Bowl Ski Area. First installed in 1988, it is activated each time Bridger Bowl accumulates two inches of fresh snow, and remains on for 24 hours thereafter. Local skiers depend upon the beacon because the ski area can have a great deal of fresh powder snow, dubbed "cold smoke" by the locals, even when it is not snowing in Bozeman. For this reason, maintenance of the light is a priority for skiers and only once in 20 years was it out of operation for two days.

== See also ==
- National Register of Historic Places listings in Gallatin County, Montana
