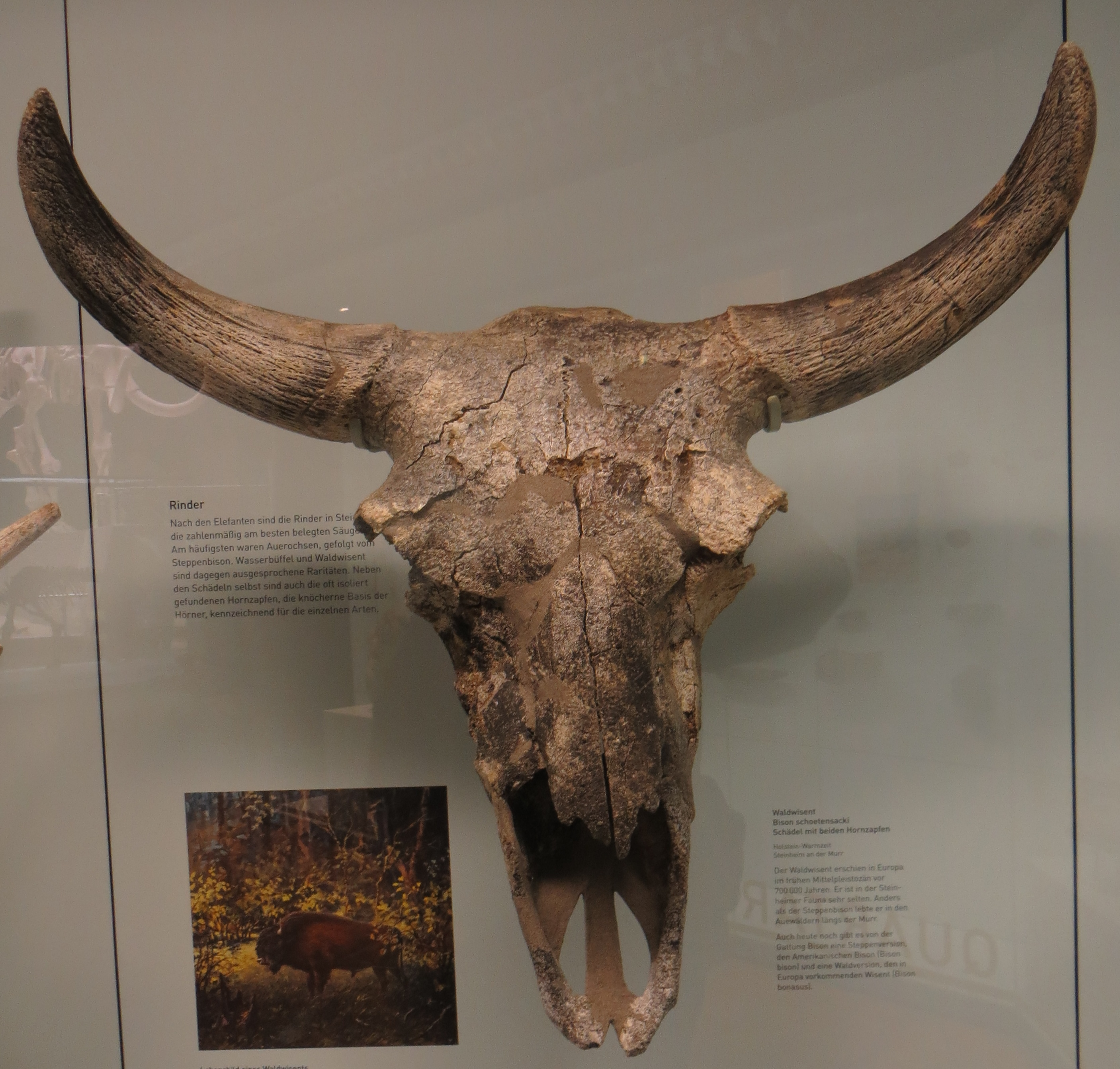
- Fossil of Bison schoetensacki at the State Museum of Natural History Stuttgart

Scientific classification
- Kingdom: Animalia
- Phylum: Chordata
- Class: Mammalia
- Order: Artiodactyla
- Family: Bovidae
- Subfamily: Bovinae
- Genus: Bison
- Species: †B. schoetensacki

Binomial name
- †Bison schoetensacki Freudenberg, 1910

= Bison schoetensacki =

Bison schoetensacki Temporal range: Late Early Pleistocene-early Middle Pleistocene 1.2–0.5 Ma

Extinct species of mammal

Bison schoetensacki is an extinct species of bison that lived from the Early Pleistocene to at least the early Middle Pleistocene (c. 1.2 to 0.5 million years ago) in Europe. Its presence in the Late Pleistocene is debated.

== Description ==
Bison schoetensacki was a relatively large bison species (with a somewhat variable body mass of around 700–950 kilograms (1,540–2,090 lb) on average) with relatively elongate limbs, with relatively advanced skulls compared to earlier bison species, with the horn cores being relatively thick and short, intermediate in form between the horns of Eobison and later Bison (Bison) species. The proportions of the metapodial bones are the most distinctive characteristic excluding the skull for distinguishing from other bison species. Compared to Bison menneri the limb bones, including the metapodials, are more robust, but are less robust than in the later steppe bison (Bison priscus). The upper molar teeth retain an "enamel islet" which is also found in earlier bison species but absent in the steppe bison.

== Diet ==
Dental wear analysis of specimens from Austria suggests varying dietary preferences for the species, with those from Deutsch-Altenburg 1 locality probably having a primarily browsing-based diet, while those from Hundsheim suggest mixed feeding. Broader analysis of specimens across Europe similarly suggests a mixed feeding diet, primarily in somewhat closed forest.

== Paleobiology ==
During the late Early and early Middle Pleistocene, B. schoetensacki was the most common large bovid in Europe. Fossils have been obtained from Czech Republic, England, Austria, France, Germany, Greece, Italy, Moldova, Russia, and Spain.

== Relationship with humans ==
At the Lower Paleolithic Isernia site in central Italy, dating back to around 700-600,000 years ago, numerous remains of B. schoetensacki, comprising at least 75 individuals, have been found at the site, with cut marks indicating that they were butchered. It has been suggested that the remains of the bison (predominantly subadults and prime age adults, with very young and very old bison being almost entirely absent) were selectively brought to the site, likely procured as a result of active hunting. A small number of bones from the similarly aged Loreto site in southern Italy also display evidence of butchery.

== Genetics ==
A 2017 study which attributed Late Pleistocene European remains to B. schoetensacki found it to belong to a mitochondrial clade which is the sister group to modern wisent, and proposed the species as a whole is likely ancestral to modern wisent. However, other studies have disputed this attribution, restricting B. schoetensacki to Early and Middle Pleistocene remains.
