= Clark Quarry =

Paleontological dig site in Georgia, U.S.

Clark Quarry is a paleontological dig site in southern Georgia. The site first discovered fossils by the building of the Brunswick Canal in 1838-1839.

== Geology ==
Clark Quarry is a cut and fill fluvial deposit overlying a marine sand, near Brunswick, Georgia, United States in Glynn County. The marine unit is characterized by a well-sorted, subrounded, low sphericity, fine- grained quartz arenite representing sediments of the Princess Anne Terrace. This site is in the pleistocene era on the geologic timescale.

== Fossils ==
- Woodchuck–Marmota monax
- Bog lemming–Synaptomys cooperi
- Capybara–Hydrochoeris holmesi
- Florida or round-tailed muskrat–Neofiber alleni
- Rice rat–Oryzomys palustris
- Cotton rat–Sigmodon hispidus
- Harvest mouse–Reithrodontomys
- Columbian Mammoth-Mammuthus columbi
- Pleistocene Bison-Bison latifrons
- American Alligator-Alligator mississippiensis
- Nerodia sp
- Garter Snake-Thamnophis sp
- Giant Ground Sloth-Megatherium
- Mastodon-Mastodon giganteum
- Horse-Equus ferus
- White-tail deer-Odocoileus virginianus
