= Ted's Montana Grill =

American restaurant chain founded by Ted Turner

- Company type: Private
- Industry: Restaurants
- Genre: Casual dining
- Founded: January 2002; 24 years ago Columbus, Ohio, U.S.
- Headquarters: Atlanta, Georgia, U.S.
- Products: Bison
- Website: www.tedsmontanagrill.com

Ted's Montana Grill is an American restaurant chain. The company was founded by media mogul and bison rancher Ted Turner, along with restaurateur George McKerrow Jr., with the help of corporate chef Chris Raucci, as a for-profit effort to stop the extinction of the American bison. The first Ted's Montana Grill opened in January 2002 in Columbus, Ohio. Today it has 37 restaurants in 14 states. Its first Montana location opened at the Baxter Hotel in Bozeman in June 2008. The company is based in Atlanta.

All bison served is National Bison Association-certified; the menu includes several other kinds of meats and vegetables. As part of the restaurant's unusual but aggressive approach to environmentalism, it "re-introduced the paper straw" which had not been produced in the United States since 1970 to avoid using plastic. They have also eco-friendly bathrooms, using dual flush toilets and eco-friendly soap. The restaurants routinely use $1 coins and $2 bills when they give change to customers.

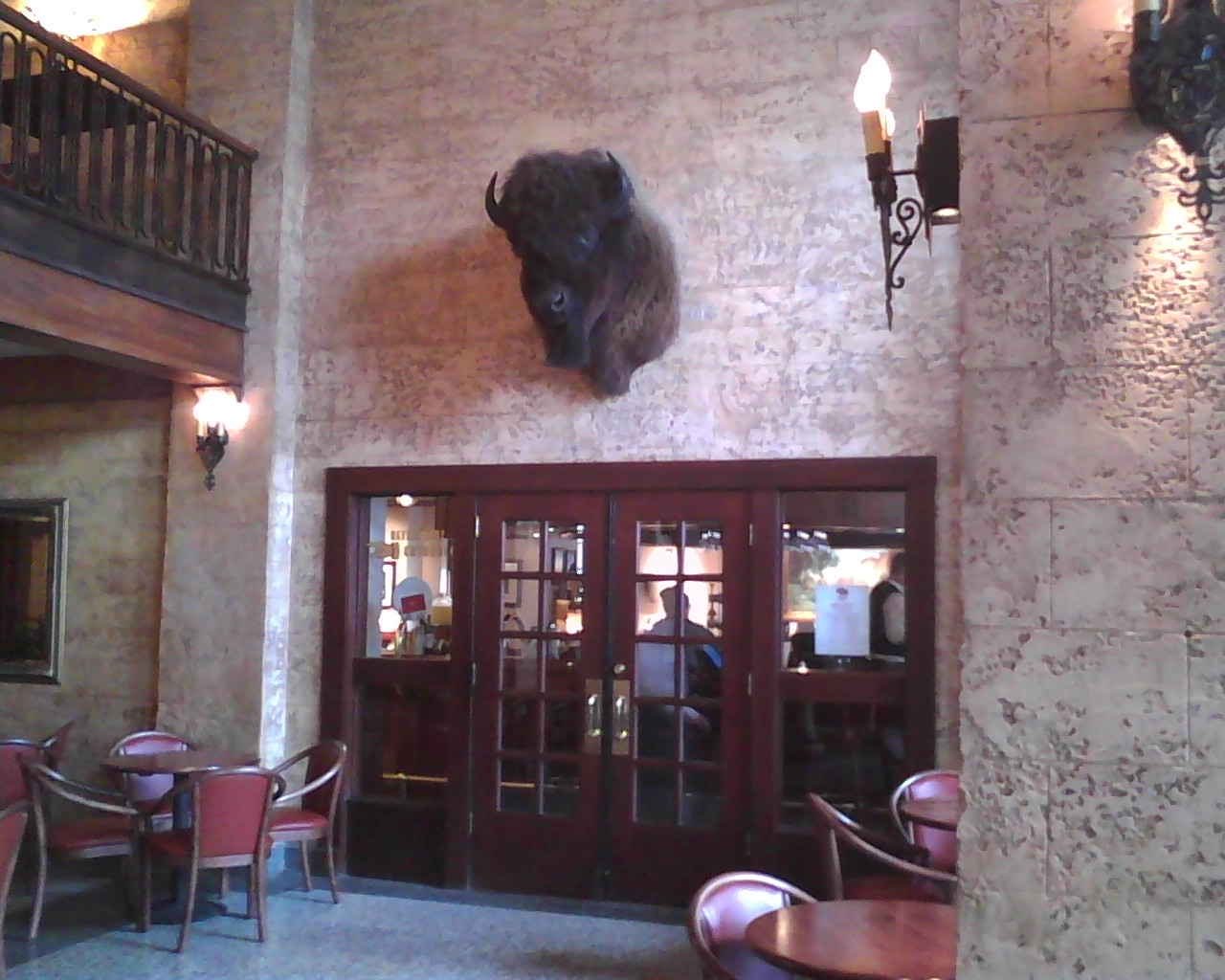
Entrance to Bozeman Ted's bar area from Baxter Hotel lobby

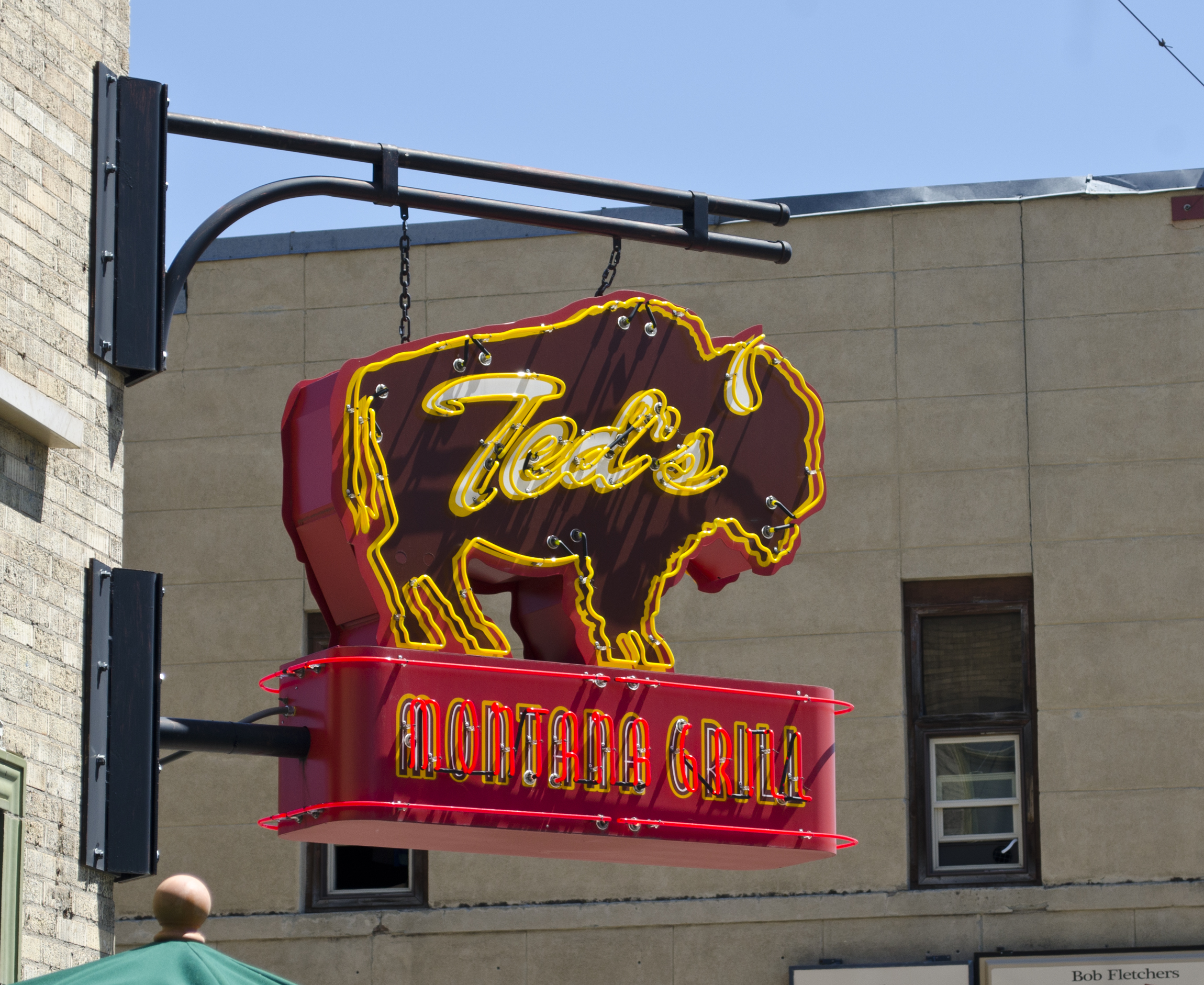
Sign for Bozeman, Montana Ted's

On November 15, 2010, Ted's Montana Grill abruptly exited the Kansas City market, closing its three area restaurants. On that same date a total of nine Ted's Montana Grill restaurants nationwide closed. The chain closed its two Wichita, Kansas, locations, its only Nebraska location, which was in Omaha, and its only Raleigh, North Carolina, location. It also closed one restaurant in the Chicago area and one in the Washington, D.C., area.

== Locations ==
- Colorado
  - Aurora (2 locations)
  - Colorado Springs
  - Greenwood Village
  - Lakewood
  - Littleton
  - Westminster
- Connecticut
  - South Windsor
- Delaware
  - Newark
- Florida
  - Estero
  - Jacksonville (2 locations)
  - Tallahassee
- Georgia
  - Alpharetta
  - Athens
  - Atlanta (2 locations)
  - Buford
  - Cumming
  - Kennesaw
  - Lawrenceville
  - Marietta
  - Peachtree Corners
  - Peachtree City
- Illinois
  - Bolingbrook
- Indiana
  - Indianapolis
- Kentucky
  - Lexington
- Massachusetts
  - Westborough
- Montana
  - Bozeman
- North Carolina
  - Charlotte
  - Durham
- Ohio
  - Columbus (2 locations)
- Tennessee
  - Nashville
- Virginia
  - Alexandria
  - Arlington
