= Cave lion =

Cave lions are large extinct carnivorous felids that are classified either as subspecies of the lion (Panthera leo), or as distinct but closely related species, depending on the authority.

The subspecies or species known by this name include:

- Panthera spelaea formerly P. leo spelaea, the Eurasian or European cave lion
- Panthera fossilis or P. spelaea fossilis or P. leo fossilis, the Early Middle Pleistocene European cave lion
- Panthera atrox or P. atrox, the American lion or American cave lion
