= Giant buffalo =

Giant buffalo may refer to:

- Bison latifrons or "giant bison", an extinct species of bison
- Syncerus antiquus or African giant buffalo, an extinct species of African buffalo
