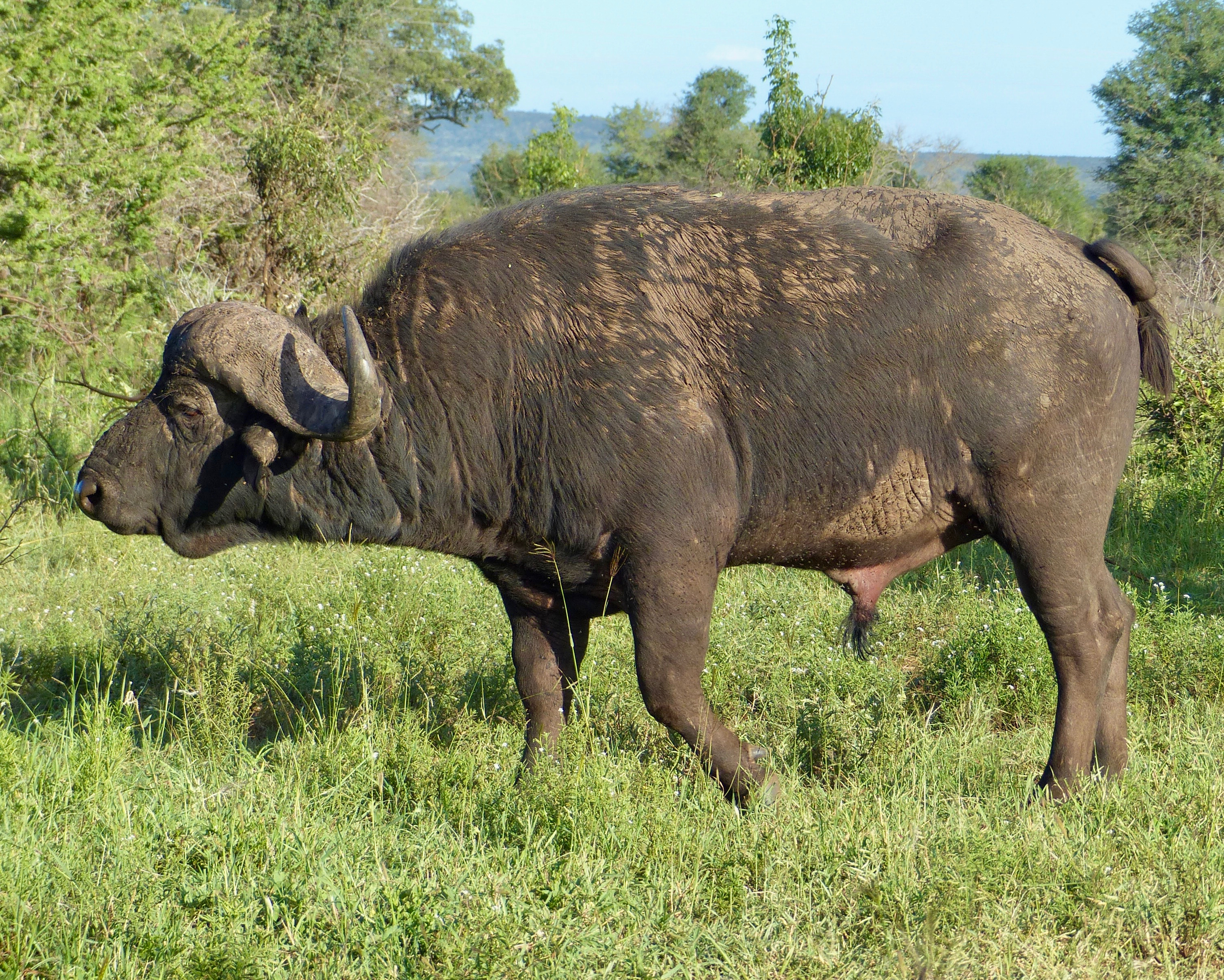
- Cape buffalo (Syncerus caffer)

Scientific classification
- Kingdom: Animalia
- Phylum: Chordata
- Class: Mammalia
- Order: Artiodactyla
- Family: Bovidae
- Subfamily: Bovinae
- Subtribe: Bubalina
- Genus: Syncerus; Hodgson, 1847

Type species
- Bos brachyceros J.E. Gray, 1837 (= Bos caffer Sparrman, 1779)

Species
- Syncerus caffer; S. c. caffer; S. c. nanus; S. c. brachyceros; S. c. aequinoctialis; S. c. mathewsi; †Syncerus acoelotus; †Syncerus antiquus; †Syncerus ekosowan

= Syncerus =

Syncerus Temporal range: 3–0 Ma Late Pliocene–Recent

Genus of mammals

Syncerus is a genus of African bovid that contains the living Cape buffalo (Syncerus caffer), including the distinct African forest buffalo.

At least one extinct species belongs to this genus; Syncerus acoelotus. The extinct giant African buffalo (Syncerus antiquus) and Syncerus ekosowan is also included in this genus by many authorities.
