= Syncerus acoelotus =

Syncerus acoelotus Temporal range: Late Pliocene - Early Pleistocene

Scientific classification
- Kingdom: Animalia
- Phylum: Chordata
- Class: Mammalia
- Order: Artiodactyla
- Family: Bovidae
- Subfamily: Bovinae
- Genus: Syncerus
- Species: †S. acoelotus

Binomial name
- †Syncerus acoelotus Gentry and Gentry, 1978

Extinct species of buffalo

Syncerus acoelotus is an extinct species of bovid closely related to the Cape buffalo. It lived during the Late Pliocene and Early Pleistocene.

Fossils of this species were first found in the Olduvai Gorge in 1962, and it was described in 1978. S. acoelotus was larger than, and probably ancestral to, its living relative.
