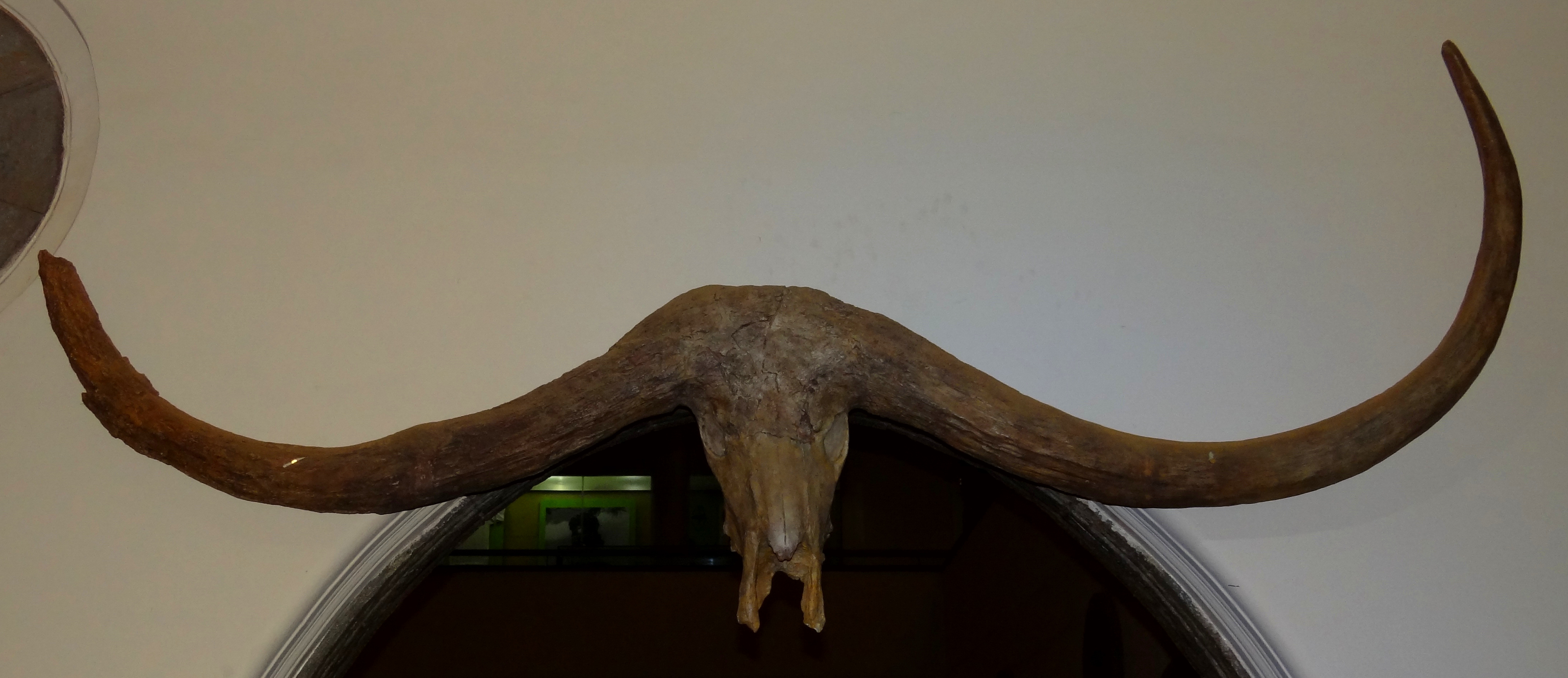
- Skull of Syncerus antiquus

Scientific classification
- Kingdom: Animalia
- Phylum: Chordata
- Class: Mammalia
- Order: Artiodactyla
- Family: Bovidae
- Subfamily: Bovinae
- Genus: Syncerus
- Species: †S. antiquus

Binomial name
- †Syncerus antiquus (Duvernoy, 1851)

Synonyms
- Bubalus antiquus; Bubalus bainii; Bubalus nilssoni; Homoioceras antiquus; Pelorovis antiquus

= Syncerus antiquus =

Syncerus antiquus Temporal range: Late Pleistocene - Holocene

Extinct species of buffalo

Syncerus antiquus is an extinct species of buffalo from the Late Pleistocene and Holocene of Africa. It was one of the largest species in its family, potentially weighing up to 2,000 kilograms (4,400 lb). Due to this fact, it is sometimes known as the African giant buffalo, or as the long-horned buffalo due to its exceptionally long horns (see Description). The time of its extinction is of debate; Syncerus antiquus either became extinct at the end of the Late Pleistocene about 12,000 years ago or during the Holocene, some 4,000 years ago.

== Taxonomy ==
Syncerus antiquus was described by Georges Louis Duvernoy in 1851 from a skull discovered along the Bou Sellam River near the city of Sétif, Algeria. It was found at one meter in depth, when excavating the foundations of a new mill, and subsequently sent to Paris. Duvernoy believed this species to be closely related to the water buffalo Bubalus bubalis and classified it as Bubalus antiquus. Several other fossils of S. antiquus were described under the names Bubalus bainii and Bubalus nilssoni.

In 1949, Dorothy Bate recognized that these buffaloes were conspecific and not related to Bubalus, so she placed these fossils in a new genus, Homoioceras. However, the type species of Homoiceros was found to be synonymous with the living African buffalo Syncerus caffer, invalidating the genus. It was subsequently moved to Pelorovis in 1978. However, a link with the living African buffalo has been noted based on morphological and systematic grounds. Since 1994, it has been suggested that P. antiquus be moved into Syncerus. This proposal has since gained widespread acceptance.

== Description ==
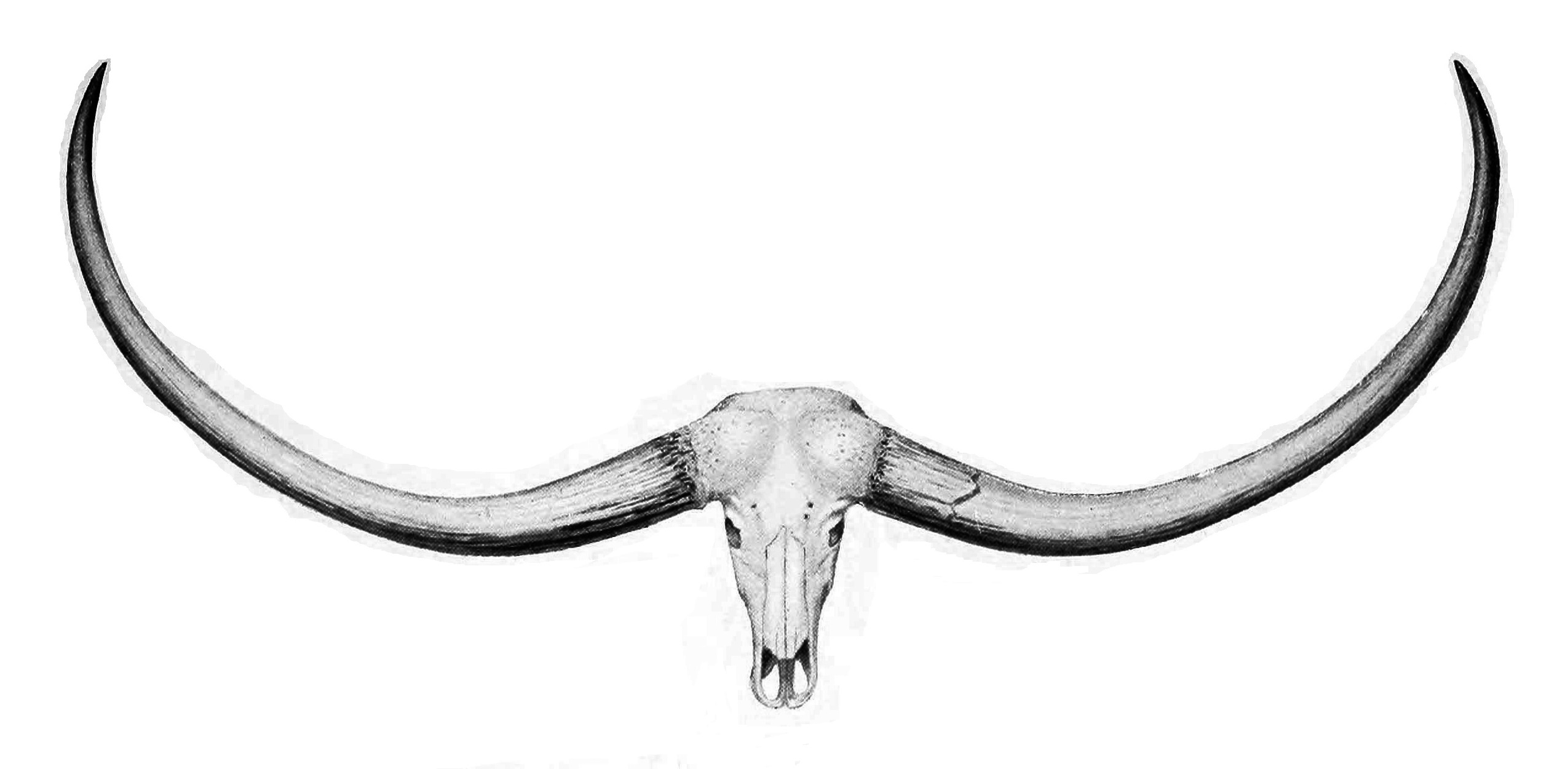
Skull of Syncerus antiquus

Syncerus antiquus holds the distinction of being the largest bovid described from Africa. According to Auguste Pomel, who was able to examine numerous fossils in Algeria, S. antiquus may have reached 3 metres (9.8 ft) in length from muzzle to the end of the tail, 1.85 metres (6.1 ft) in height at the withers, and 1.7 metres (5.6 ft) in height at the hindquarters. The distance between the tips of its horns was as large as 2.4 m (7 ft 10 in). It probably weighed about 1,200 kilograms (2,600 lb) on average, though the largest males could have potentially attained weights of up to 2,000 kilograms (4,400 lb).

One of the defining features of Syncerus antiquus are its massive horns. The largest horn cores can reach sizes of as much as 3 metres (9.8 ft) from tip to tip. The horns resembled those of the wild water buffalo (Bubalus arnee) in shape.

== Distribution ==
This buffalo had the broadest geographic distribution of any recently extinct species of African bovid, being widespread throughout eastern, southern and northern Africa. Material has been dated to the Late Pleistocene, between 107 and 13 ka.

However, rock art from North Africa seemingly depicting Syncerus antiquus suggests that this species survived into the Holocene. Possible fossils of S. antiquus have also been found in Holocene deposits.

== Paleoecology ==
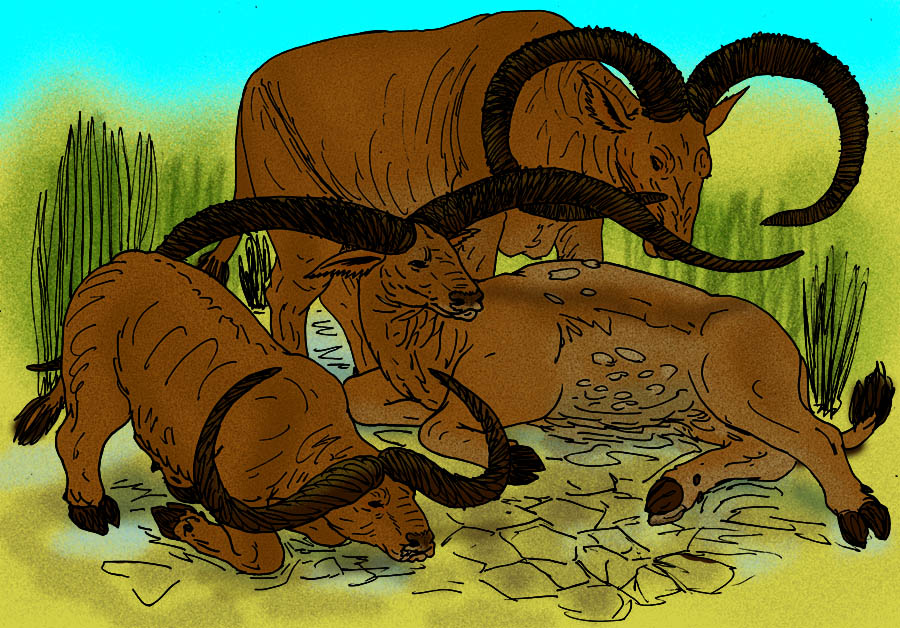
Restoration of Syncerus antiquus (far left)

Due to possessing such vast horns, it seems likely that Syncerus antiquus was limited to wide-open areas with few trees. Isotopic and mesowear evidence indicate that it was a grazer, and its massive body size suggests that it consumed large quantities of low-quality forage.

Judging from the rock art, it seems pairs of the male animals (testes are illustrated) would fight by ramming each other's horns with their heads lowered – this is illustrated numerous times. Rock art also suggests that it may have lived in large herds.

== Recent survival and extinction ==
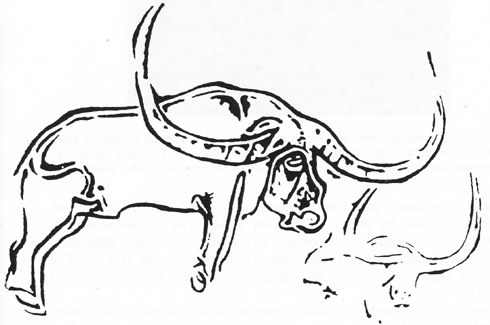
Rock art of "great bubaline" from northern Africa, thought to depict S. antiquus

A large amount of rock art has been found illustrating the species Syncerus antiquus in the Maghreb, the Atlas, the Sahara and near to the Atlantic and Mediterranean coasts of North Africa. The art is found in a wide band stretching from Tunisia through Algeria to Morocco. This art not only indicates that the buffalo may have survived until recent times, it also indicates these animals were being actively hunted with spears, possibly by the first of the Berber peoples.

Its extinction has been variously attributed to human predation, climatic change, or some combination of the two.
