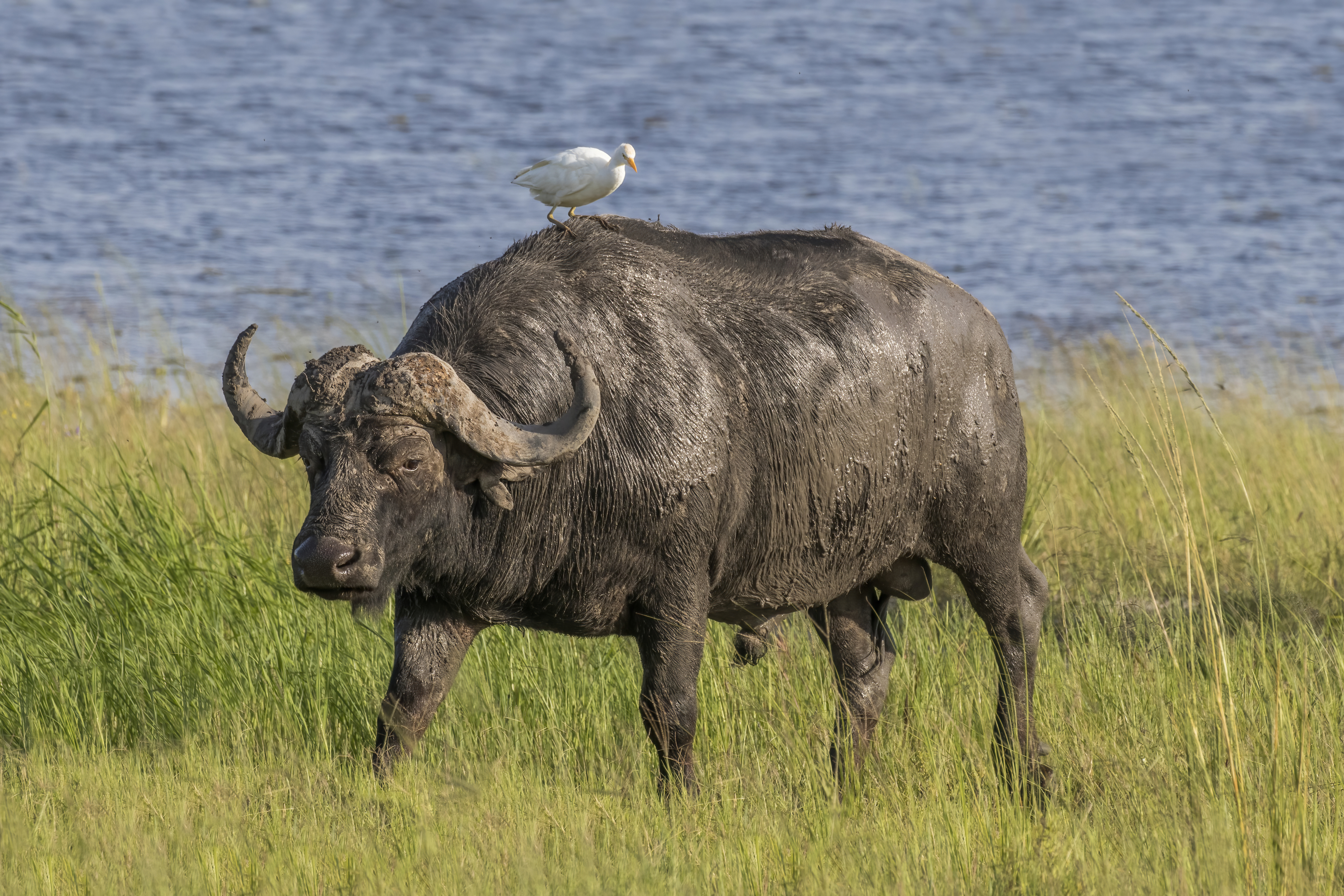
- Cape buffalo (S. c. caffer) at Chobe National Park, Botswana with a cattle egret atop it

Conservation status
- Near Threatened (IUCN 3.1)

Scientific classification
- Kingdom: Animalia
- Phylum: Chordata
- Class: Mammalia
- Order: Artiodactyla
- Family: Bovidae
- Subfamily: Bovinae
- Genus: Syncerus
- Species: S. caffer

Binomial name
- Syncerus caffer (Sparrman, 1779)

Subspecies
- S. c. caffer S. c. nanus S. c. brachyceros S. c. aequinoctialis
- African buffalo distribution highlighted in red

Synonyms
- Bos caffer Sparrman, 1779; Bos brachyceros J.E. Gray, 1837

= African buffalo =

African buffalo Temporal range: Pleistocene–Present

Species of mammal

The African buffalo (Syncerus caffer) is a large bovine native to sub-Saharan Africa. First described in 1779 by Anders Sparrman, it is the only extant species of the genus Syncerus. Four subspecies are currently recognized: the Cape buffalo, West African savanna buffalo, Central African savanna buffalo, and African forest buffalo. It is a heavily built animal with a broad head and torso, a strong neck, large horns, and a bony armor or "boss" across the forehead of males. The fur ranges in color from rusty to black, and the tail ends with a dark, tuft of hair.

The African buffalo occurs in a variety of habitats, such as woodlands, savannas, forests, grasslands, shrublands, and wetlands. It is a ruminant and a grazer, primarily feeding on grass and dietary fiber. A social animal, the African buffalo forms herds ranging in size from a few individuals to over a thousand members. Herds typically consist of adult females and their young, and a number of adult males that temporarily join herds for mating opportunities. Males have a pecking order where dominant individuals hold the best access to mates. After a gestation of more than 10 months, females give birth to a single calf. Weaning occurs between 10 and 18 months, and the lifespan is about 12 years in the wild. Adult African buffaloes have few natural predators because of their size and aggression, though calves are much more vulnerable.

Since the 19th century, the African buffalo's range has greatly reduced due to human factors such as poaching, climate change, agriculture, and disease outbreaks. Despite this trend, conservation efforts have managed to increase populations in some parts of its range. As of 2019, it is listed as Near Threatened on the IUCN Red List, with an estimated population of 398,000 to 401,000 mature individuals. A Big Five game animal, the African buffalo is legally hunted as a trophy in 16 out of 37 range countries. It has co-existed alongside humans for thousands of years and has in many ways contributed to human culture.

== Taxonomy ==
The African buffalo was first described by Anders Sparrman as Bos caffer in 1779. Sparrman placed the species in the same genus (Bos) as the water buffalo, an animal described as Bos bubalis in 1758 by his mentor Carl Linnaeus. Later in the 19th century, the two species were placed into different genera, with the water buffalo being moved to Bubalus in 1827 by Charles Hamilton Smith and the African buffalo to Syncerus by Brian Hodgson in 1847. The genus Syncerus differs from Bos in the backwards-directed hairs along on the back of the neck, as well as in the lack of fusion between the palatine bone and the vomer in the roof of the mouth. Parallel evolution may explain the similar horn shapes in the two genera.

The African buffalo is a member of the Bovini tribe within the Bovinae subfamily of the Bovidae family. There are around 140 species within 40 genera in Bovidae; members are characterized by the presence of true horns in males or in both sexes. The Bovini tribe is further divided into three subtribes based on data of complete chromosome sets, and ribosomal and mitochondrial DNA sequences. Syncerus and Bubalus are placed in the Bubalina subtribe, that alongside the Bovina subtribe—which contains cattle, bison, yaks, gaurs, and bantengs—emerged 10–15 million years ago. Between 6 and 9.8 million years ago, Syncerus and Bubalus split from a common ancestor, according to genetic evidence. It is unclear which ancestor gave rise to the African buffalo but a hypothesis proposes that Syncerus could be a direct descendent of the Pliocene bovid Simatherium which itself may have evolved from the earlier bovid Ugandax. Cladistic evidence seem to contradict this hypothesis.

Syncerus acoelotus is possibly the earliest known species of Syncerus and although its horns were not as prominent as those of the African buffalo, the two animals were roughly equal in size. The African buffalo is the only extant species of the genus, emerging between 500.000 and 1 million years ago. As savannas continuously expanded during glacial and interpluvial periods, the species spread across sub-Saharan Africa in the early stage of its emergence. Two lineages were formed following restriction of populations into savanna refugia during a period of drastic environmental changes roughly 130 to 300 thousand years ago; in the late to middle Pleistocene, new migration waves in the two lineages began from Central to West Africa and Central to Southern Africa, respectively.

The following phylogenetic tree is based on a 2022 molecular analysis of 11 species of Bovidae:

- saola
- - - African buffalo
    - - lowland anoa
      - water buffalo
  - - - American bison
      - yak
    - - European bison
      - - zebu
        - - †auroch
          - - cattle
            - banteng

=== Subspecies ===
Much discussion has been made about the African buffalo's taxonomy because throughout its range, populations differ noticeably in physical appearance. The IUCN Red List currently lists four subspecies: the Cape buffalo (S.c. caffer), the African forest buffalo (S.c. nanus), the West African savanna buffalo (S.c. brachyceros), and the Central African savanna buffalo (S.c. aequinoctialis). Some authors have proposed that only three subspecies—the Cape, African forest, and northern savanna buffaloes (S.c. umarii)—would be recognized if genetic evidence is taken into account when determining subspecies, while others have suggested that the forest, and West and Central African buffaloes be classified as a single subspecies because of their phylogenetic similarities. However, studies of the genes of populations in different regions provide no support to either conclusion.

Results derived from maternally inherited mitochondrial DNA and paternally inherited Y-chromosomes reveal two lineages of African buffalo. The first lineage is made up of a single subspecies, the Cape buffalo, which is found in East and Southern Africa, while the second includes West and Central African populations, of which there are three subspecies. Spatial patterns of microsatellites show that the Cape buffalo lineage, as well as the West and Central African subspecies, underwent slow, continuous genetic changes throughout their ranges; these patterns serve as evidence for the existence of a once large metapopulation of savanna buffalo. In the Central African Republic, the forest buffalo shows similar clinal patterns, but with double the genetic changes accumulated possibly due to restricted gene flow and the fact that there are less forest buffaloes per square kilometer than savanna buffaloes.

The following is a table based on the taxonomic classification used by the IUCN.

Name	Image	Description	Ecological grouping
Cape buffalo (S. c. caffer)	Cape buffalo grazing on grass in lush green field	The largest and most abundant subspecies, with males weighing up to 900 kg (2,000 lb). Horns can grow to a maximum of 165 cm (65 in) in males and 150 cm (59 in) in females. Adults are usually black in color and have a skin thickness of more than 2 to 3 cm (0.79 to 1.18 in). In males, the large skull is held up by a hump situated above the shoulders.	Savanna buffalo
West African savanna buffalo (S. c. brachyceros)	Front view of West African buffalo in a dry environment	Adults are 120 to 145 cm (47 to 57 in) tall at the shoulders, 200 to 245 cm (79 to 96 in) in body length and weigh 300 to 600 kg (660 to 1,320 lb). Reddish individuals are found across the subspecies' range. Horns have a length of 56 to 103 cm (22 to 41 in) and a span of 56 to 103 cm (22 to 41 in). In some parts of its range, there have been reports of hybrids with the forest buffalo.	Savanna buffalo
Central African savanna buffalo (S. c. aequinoctialis)	Adult Central African buffalo facing the camera, as another buffalo feeds in the background and an egret stands besides it	Intermediate subspecies similar in physical dimensions to the West African buffalo. Red forms exist across its range.	Savanna buffalo
African forest buffalo (S. c. nanus)	A forest buffalo standing alone in an open field	The smallest subspecies, with a body mass about 50% smaller than that of the Cape buffalo. The coat is rusty to black in color, and horns are up to 69 cm (27 in) long. Compared to other subspecies, adults have less pronounced sexual dimorphism.	Forest buffalo

== Distribution and habitat ==
Historically, the African buffalo ranged throughout most of sub-Saharan Africa. Since the 19th century, the species lost a major chunk of its range due to poaching, climate change, agriculture, and disease outbreaks. Protected and managed hunting areas host the majority of savanna buffalo populations. The Cape buffalo occurs across East Africa in isolated pockets from southern Ethiopia and southern Somalia, to as far south as South Africa and as far west as Angola. Both the West and Central African buffaloes are found within the Sudano-Sahelian zone, with the former ranging from Senegal in the west to Cameroon in the east, whereas the latter is distributed north to Chad, south to the Democratic Republic of Congo, and east to Ethiopia. In West and Central Africa, there are two separate populations of forest buffalo.

The African buffalo can be found in a variety of habitats, such as woodlands, savannas, forests, grasslands, shrublands, and wetlands. A requirement the species has for survival in partially dry areas is that a permanent water source should not be beyond 20–40 km (12–25 mi). Normally, it prefers habitats that receive over 250 mm of rain each year and that are home to herbaceous plants. In East and Southern Africa, buffalo populations prefer woodlands, while those in West and Central Africa are found in various mixed woodland-grassland habitats. The forest buffalo lives in forest-savanna mosaics and rainforests.

== Description ==
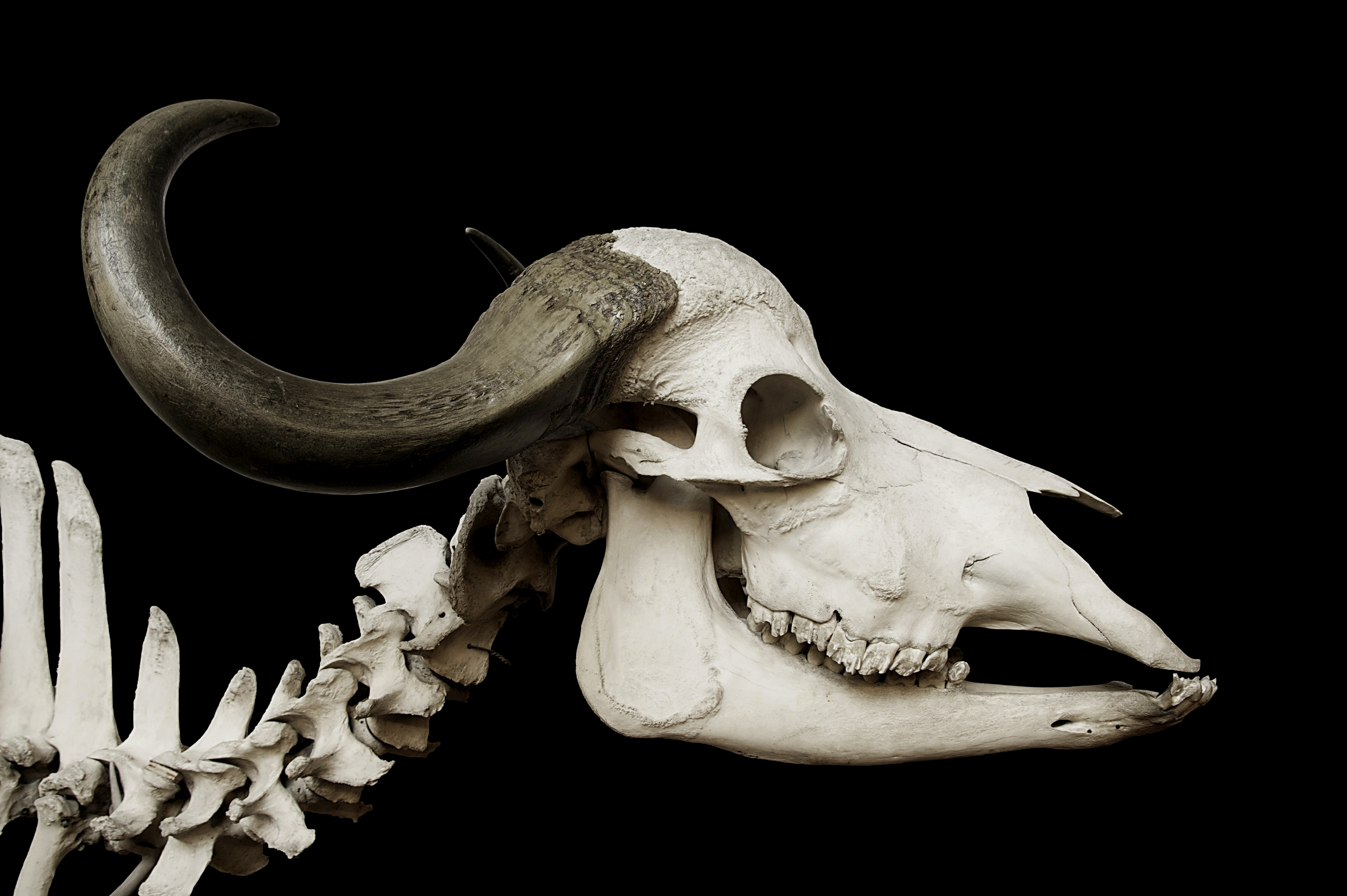
Skull and neck vertebrae

Cape buffalo at Lake Mburo National Park, Uganda

The African buffalo is among the most polymorphic of African mammals, as populations vary considerably in size, color, and horn shape. The largest subspecies, the Cape buffalo, has a head-to-body length of 210 to 300 cm (83 to 118 in) and a shoulder height of 140 to 160 cm (55 to 63 in). Males weigh 650 to 900 kg (1,430 to 1,980 lb), whereas females reach a maximum of 500 kg (1,100 lb). At 100 to 130 cm (39 to 51 in) tall at the shoulder, 170 to 220 cm (67 to 87 in) in body length and 265 to 320 kg (584 to 705 lb) in weight, the forest buffalo is the smallest subspecies.

A large bovine, the African buffalo is characterized by its heavyset body with a large head and torso, thick, muscular neck, stubby legs, and curved hooves that grow larger in the forelegs than the hindlegs. The sagged, often marred ears are outlined with long hairs, and a wet nose lies on a broad snout with big eyes. The African buffalo is rusty to black in color and has a dark, tuft of hair at the end of a 55 to 120 cm (22 to 47 in) long tail. Before obtaining the adult coat, young Cape buffaloes change in color from tawny to dark brown, and gradually reduce their coat density. Adult forest buffaloes typically have a rusty to black coat pattern, whereas the denser coat of young individuals is more reddish, sometimes with black markings.

Both sexes have large horns, which in males form a boss (a continuous bony armor) when bone fuses between the base of the horns. The boss is most pronounced in male Cape buffaloes. Females in savanna populations have smaller horns than those of males and instead of a boss, females have hairy skin between their horns. Compared to the Cape buffalo, West and Central African buffaloes possess similar laterally curved horns, but without the downward arch. Conversely, the horns of forest buffaloes point horizontally backwards, lack a boss and are smaller than those of savanna buffaloes.

== Behavior and ecology ==
=== Social behavior ===
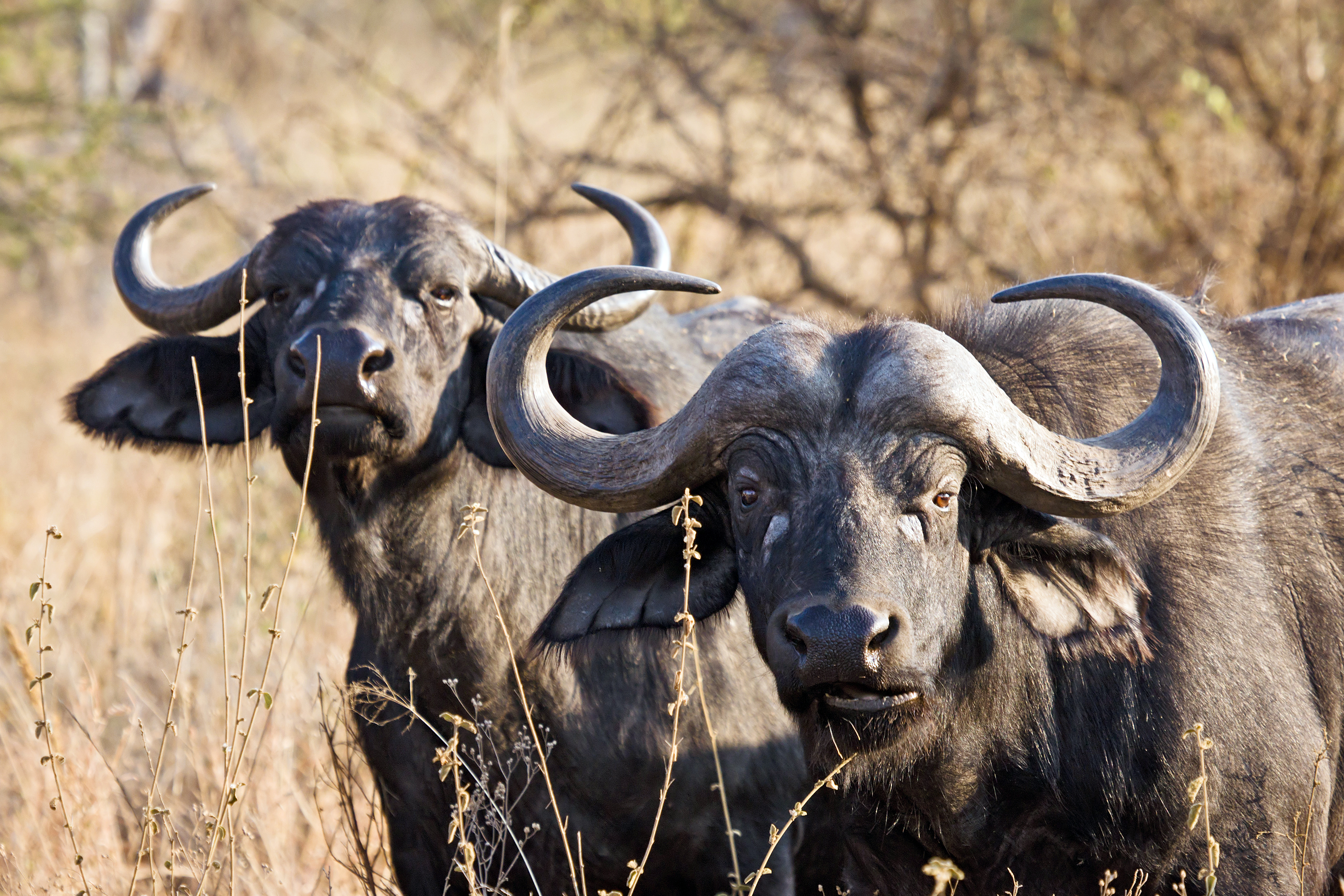
Male (right) and female (left) Cape buffalo in Serengeti National Park, Tanzania

Adult females form the core of African buffalo herds. The number of individuals in herds is variable and differs across regions; for West and Central African buffaloes, herds of females and their young have an average of 45 and a maximum of 150 individuals, whereas in Southern and East African floodplains, Cape buffaloes are known to form large herds of up to 2,000 members. About 3–25 animals make up a forest buffalo herd.

Female savanna buffaloes remain with the herd for life and may continue bonding with their mother even after the age of weaning. On the other hand, young males grow increasingly detached from their mothers and separate from the herd to join bachelor groups at age four to five for a limited period. They later join a herd to compete for mating opportunities. As males lose their strength, they again leave for bachelor groups so as to recover by excessively grazing in areas inaccessible to herds. The permanent departure of males aged ten or older from mixed herds sometimes occurs. In the forest buffalo, males make up the minority of the stable herd and travel with the group throughout the year.

Male Cape buffaloes at Lake Nakuru National Park, Kenya

Savanna buffaloes form durable groups that have been known to last over 50 years. These groups generally show a strong preference for their home ranges. In mixed herds, fission-fusion behaviors exist, where members briefly separate and form subgroups, then unify once more. Separation can occur during both the wet and dry seasons. Sometimes, separation may be due to large herd size. A few bulls and some females lead the herd when foraging. Decisions on where to eat or drink are not made by these individuals but rather through a process called 'voting.' After a lengthy resting session, right before dusk, adult females will stand up, raise their heads, and point in a particular direction, then again rest. If multiple voting females point in the same direction, consensus is strong. However, in cases of weak consensus, the herd may separate and rejoin days later.

Most forest buffalo sightings are of groups, though solitary individuals of both sexes have been observed. Solitary male sightings are more frequent than sightings of solitary females. In Dzanga-Ndoki National Park between 2007 and 2008, short-lived fission-fusion dynamics and a correlation between an increase in herd size and fission-fusion dynamics were recorded in a specific herd. Another finding was that during the wet season members of the herd traveled farther away from each other in smaller groups.

In savanna buffaloes, sparring occurs in both subadult and adult males, often concluding with hooking of the other buffalo by the victor after a period of horn butting and shoving. Possible reasons for sparring include the assessment of dominance or enjoyment. Subadult females rarely interact with each other and when they do, interactions are often limited. Positioning where individuals occupy a specific location within a herd is observed in adult females and their young. Females may inherit a specific location from their mother. Behaviors such as using horns for butting and hooking of opponents on their side and hindquarter may contribute to positioning within a herd. Among male buffaloes, there is a pecking order. Dominant individuals accentuate their shoulders during a threat posture by lowering the nose while lifting the head up. Often while bellowing, subordinate males respond to challenges by lowering the head and moving behind a dominant male to position the nose between his hindlegs. Fighting among males is extremely uncommon as in most cases, males observe each other from a distance and avoid direct interaction. Only when two bulls are evenly matched do fights occur, and such encounters could turn deadly. Although submission has been recorded in subadult males, adult females and juveniles in Ika Bai, Cameroon, forest buffaloes display few aggressive or dominance-related behaviors. According to a 2007 study in Dzanga-Ndoki National Park, during feeding and resting hours, most interactions between herd members, involves the chasing, usually by females, of other other group members, usually juveniles. Competition for ideal resting and feeding grounds is cited as a possible cause.

The African buffalo rarely makes sounds such as grunts, beeps, bellows, snorts, croaks and coughs. When seriously or mortality injured, a bull may emit a loud bellow which could attract the attention of another bull who assists in about 33% of cases involving predator attacks. Coughs and snorts are usually made when threatened. Conversely, buffalo remain silent, particularly at night, in order to more easily spot threats and warn others, though no alarm call exists.

=== Habitat use and activity patterns ===
Cape buffalo bull resting

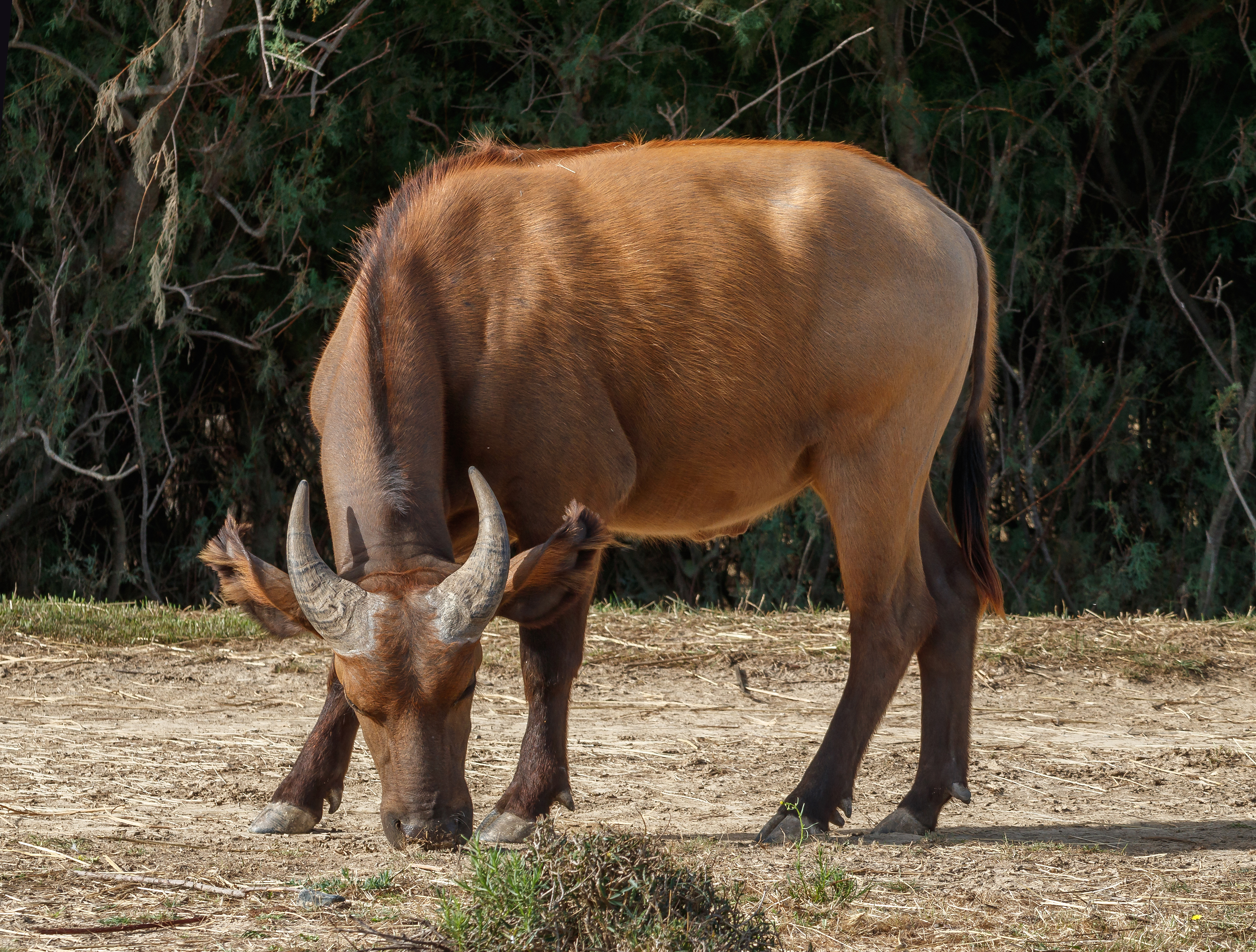
Forest buffalo grazing

Home ranges for herds of savanna buffaloes vary from as small as 50 km^{2} (19 sq mi) to as large as 350 km^{2} (140 sq mi). Forest buffaloes have the smallest home ranges of any subspecies, and are mostly found in forests during the dry season and marshes during the wet season. Average home ranges in Lopé National Park were reported at 4.6 km^{2} (1.8 sq mi) between 2002 and 2004. In savanna populations, herds that have to travel large distances seasonally to locate patchily distributed resources have greater home ranges. Bachelor groups on the other hand, have small home ranges of only 0.5 to 4.0 km^{2} (0.19 to 1.54 sq mi). Herds in some environments increase their home ranges during the wet season as resources become plentiful, but are restricted to the vicinity of water sources during the dry season. In water-rich environments, home ranges may instead expand during the dry season.

Migration has been observed in savanna populations. Throughout their range, they do not always follow the same migration patterns and in some areas, not every member of a group may choose to migrate. According to a 2014 study, the longest African buffalo movements occur in the Kavango–Zambezi Transfrontier Conservation Area, including one case of a female which undertook a more than 170 km (110 mi) round trip in successive wet seasons. Most migrations happen during this period because of the availability of good quality grass in savannas and upland woodlands. The curing of grass and the retreat of water in these habitats during the dry season eventually forces buffaloes to migrate to lowland areas as they are home to moist soil for vegetation growth. West African buffaloes in W Regional Park have been recorded in a 2011 study undertaking longer migrations from a permanent water source during the wet season because vegetation became more plentiful in south-west areas. Herds moved 25 to 45 km (16 to 28 mi) south-west from permanent water sources during the monsoon, whereas in the dry season, they remained within 3.3 to 5.3 km (2.1 to 3.3 mi) of one.

The African buffalo spends about 17 to 19 hours a day feeding and ruminating. It is highly dependent on water, requiring 45 L (9.9 imp gal; 12 U.S. gal) daily every 2 or more days. Feeding generally occurs from dawn to mid-morning hours and from late-evening to mid-night hours. The total feeding time during the night is comparable to the feeding time during the day, and across seasons, feeding time is greater in the dry than in the wet season. A study conducted in West Africa in 2011 found buffaloes to spend equal amounts of day and night hours performing daily activities, especially during crepuscular hours.

Savanna buffalo populations have been recorded traveling a minimum of 3.1 km (1.9 mi) and a maximum of 8.9 km (5.5 mi) per day. On the contrary, forest buffaloes only travel 0.5 to 1.5 km (0.31 to 0.93 mi) per day, according to a study in Dzanga-Ndoki National Park, Central African Republic. During the late afternoon, when temperatures are at their highest, forest and male savanna buffaloes wallow to keep cool, though the former wallow more during the dry season. Members of mixed herds in savanna populations typically seek shade from the searing midday heat.

=== Diet ===
As a ruminant, the African buffalo derives most of its diet from grass and dietary fiber; per day, it consumes 6.5 to 15 kg (14 to 33 lb) of vegetation. In some cases, it is known to live off grass that most other herbivores either find excessively tall or very tough to chew, though it is unable to shorten grass as much as other herbivores and instead clears the landscape for short-grass herbivores, thereby filling the ecological niche of an ecosystem engineer. Its preferred foraging grounds include floodplains and forest glades, as they offer large pastures and grass leaves of at least 10 cm (3.9 in) tall. The plains zebra (Equus quagga), African bush elephant (Loxodonta africana, blue wildebeest (Connochaetes taurinus), and cattle (Bos taurus) compete with the African buffalo for resources.

The Cape buffalo subspecies prefers grass such as panicgrass, Guinea grass, and fonio, and during the dry season when food loses much of its nutrition, vital energy sources include Leersia hexandra, Setaria sphacelata, and Cyperus laevigatus. In West and Central African buffaloes, perennial grass, beard grass, foxtail, and flatsedges are the preferred grass genera. During the dry season, as grass turns woody in texture, savanna populations partially adopt browsing herbivory, consuming shrubs and tree leaves. Tall grasses and sedges, as well as reeds, are foods that savanna populations subsist on during droughts because they are easier to digest and are more nutritious. Studies on forest buffalo feeding ecology suggest that it feeds on graminoids, arrowroot, day flowers, and cryptogams.

=== Reproduction ===
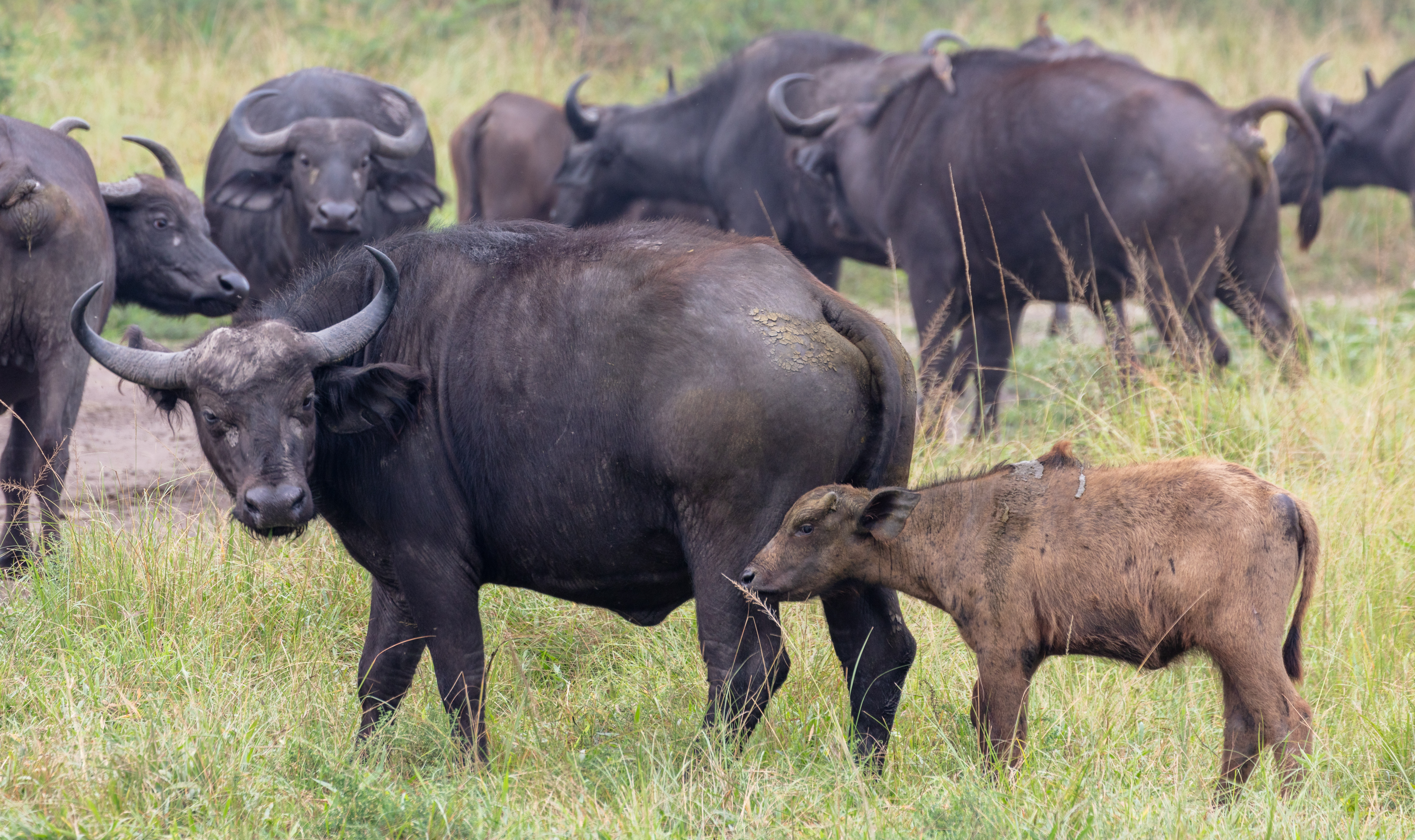
Cape buffalo mother and calf

Most Cape buffalo calves are born during the wet season, except in more mesic areas. Data on forest buffalo reproduction is limited, though observations indicate that births can occur during both the dry and wet seasons. Female Cape buffaloes in captivity enter heat for 5 to 6 days in a 23-day cycle, according to one study. Males assess a female's readiness to mate by sniffing chemicals in her urine. Usually, dominant males mate with most of the females in heat. After a gestation of around 340 days, females typically give birth within the herd to a single calf, weighing 30 to 40 kg (66 to 88 lb). Calves nurse behind the hindquarters, which allows the mother to move with the herd while continuing to suckle her young. As calves increase in age from one to six month(s), they decrease the time spent suckling by 50%; weaning occurs between 10 and 18 months, depending on factors such as population density and competition between buffaloes. Females begin breeding by age five, which is less than two years after they start to ovulate, while males typically breed by at least age seven, despite being sexually mature at five to six. Lifespan is about 12 years in the wild, though some individuals may reach 20. In captivity, the maximum lifespan is nearly 30 years.

Female forest buffaloes give birth to a single calf every two years after a gestation of more than 300 days. A 2008 study in Dzanga-Ndoki National Park observed that during birth, females leave the herd for a few days and when feeding, hide their calves in vegetation. Similar behaviors have been observed in Cape buffaloes. Once calves are able to walk steadily, female forest buffaloes return to the herd and raise their young for two or more years. Both sexes reach adulthood past the age of five and females first breed by at least age three.

=== Mortality factors ===
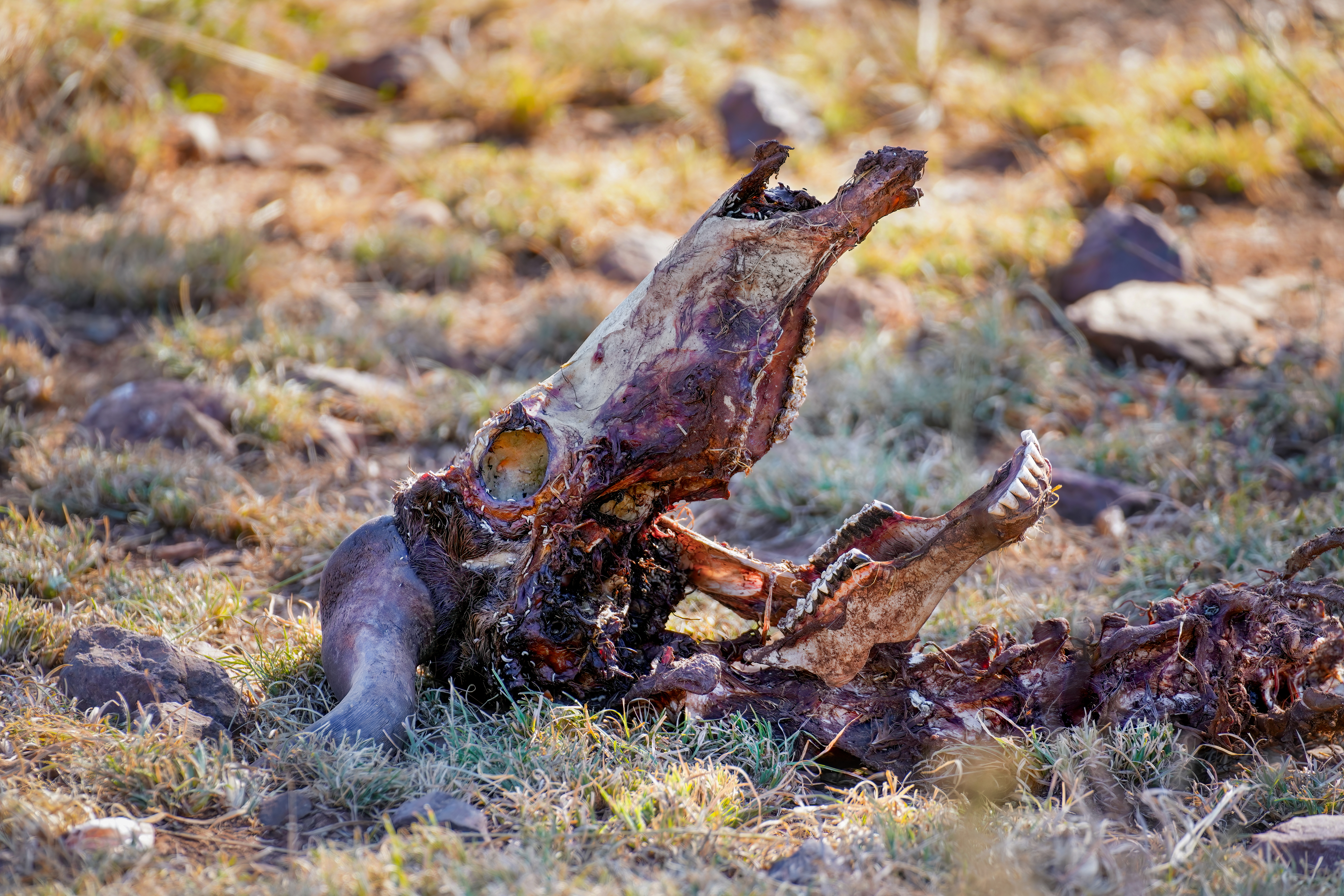
Decomposing skull

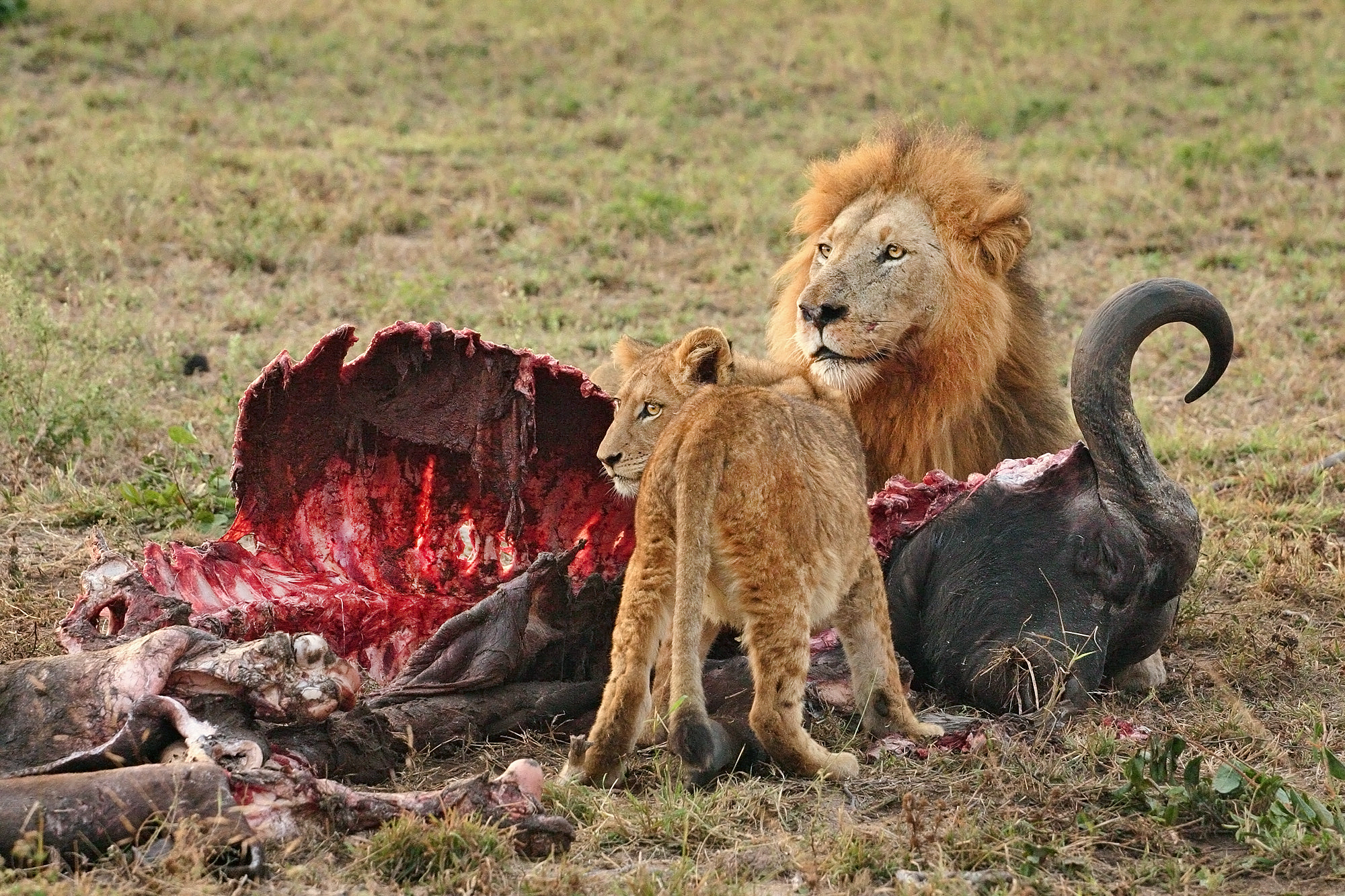
Male lion and cub feeding on a Cape buffalo carcass

When triggered, the African buffalo becomes aggressive, a behavior that along with its large size ensure that it is a target for only a few predators; calves, on the other hand, are vulnerable to predation by multiple predators, including lions (Panthera leo), African wild dogs (Lycaon pictus), spotted hyenas (Crocuta crocuta), leopards (Panthera pardus), and Central African rock pythons (Python sebae). Nile crocodiles (Crocodylus niloticus) are known to prey on adult savanna buffaloes, though lions are the main predators of the Cape buffalo subspecies. To sneak up on a herd and isolate an individual, lions typically take advantage of thick vegetation. If successful, lions attack the rear to bring a buffalo down but because of the buffalo's thick neck the felines are instead forced to subdue the animal with a suffocation bite to the nose. In other cases, the buffalo drives off or even kills lions. By positioning its rear to thick bushes and utilizing its horns, a buffalo becomes especially successful at fending off lions and in open areas, large herds may offer protection from lion predation. Buffalo can also leap around 1.5 m (4 ft 11 in) and run at top speeds of 55 to 60 km/h (34 to 37 mph). In exceptional cases, the forest buffalo has been known to fall prey to leopards. Possible anti-predator behaviors of this subspecies include resting and moving as a group, and stampeding characterized by a female taking the lead and a male trailing behind.

Like all ungulates, the African buffalo is likely susceptible to rinderpest, a disease caused by Morbillivirus. Transmission occurs when respiratory droplets or feces from an affected animal contaminate a healthy one. Severe diarrhea and dehydration are associated symptoms that often lead to death. The African buffalo serves as a maintenance host for Mycobacterium bovis, a bacteria that causes bovine tuberculosis. Other infections include brucellosis, anthrax, haemorrhagic septicaemia, foot-and-mouth disease, theileriosis, trypanosomiasis, rabies, tick-borne diseases, and African insect-borne diseases.

== Conservation ==
As of 2019, the African buffalo is listed as Near Threatened on the IUCN Red List. There are currently 398,000 to 401,000 mature individuals left in the wild. Human activities such as poaching, habitat destruction, and wars pose serious threats to the species. The use of the African buffalo for bushmeat is widespread and could lead to local population declines or complete eradication. Other threats include droughts and disease outbreaks.

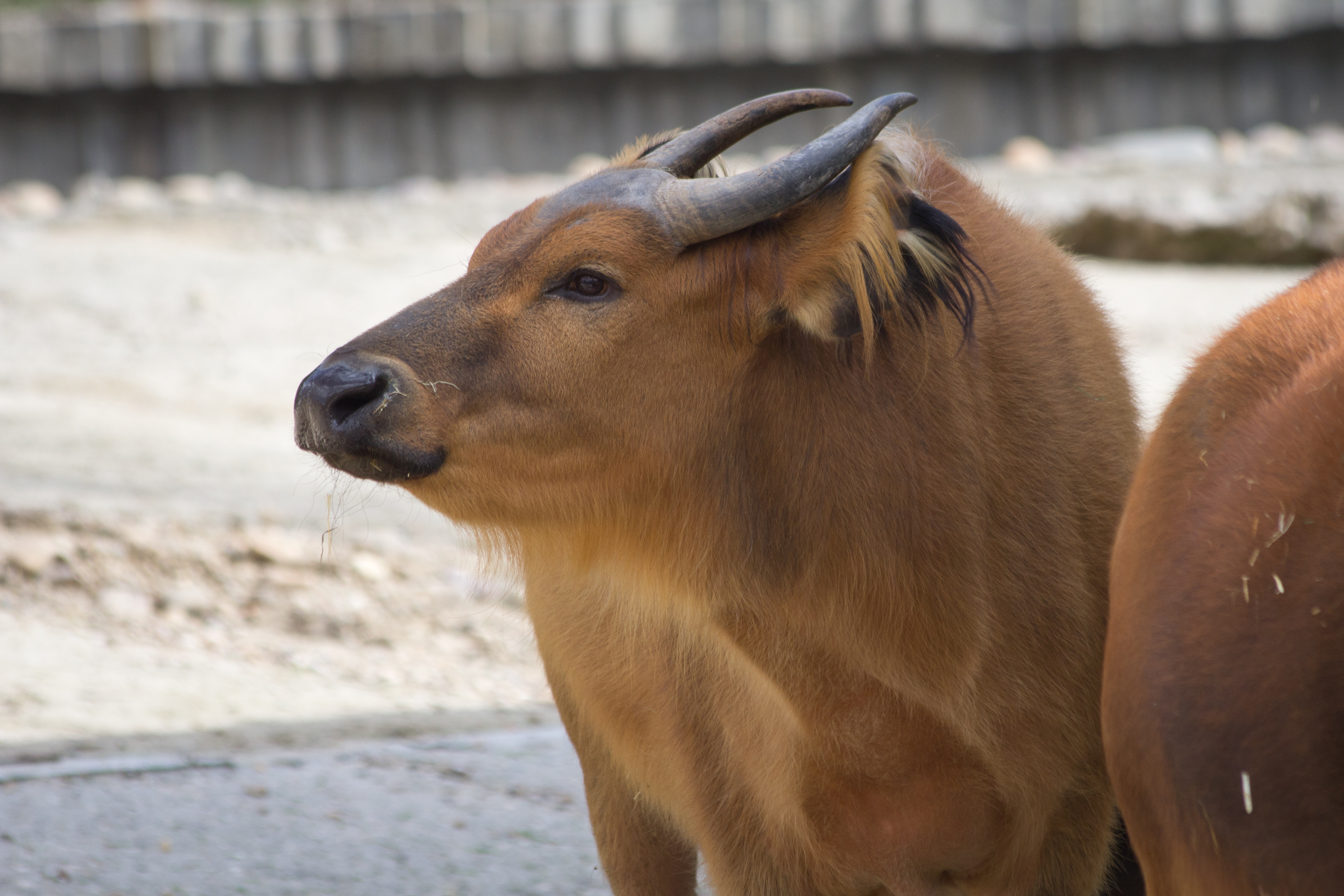
Forest buffalo at the Madrid Zoo, Spain

The West African buffalo persists in a handful of strongholds in countries like Ivory Coast, Senegal, Burkina Faso, Benin, Cameroon, and Niger. Populations are scattered, and geographic distribution has reduced. In a 2023 investigation, West African buffalo populations in these strongholds were shown to have either increased or remained stable, except in Cameroon, where populations experienced a decline. Strongholds for the Central African buffalo include Garamba National Park in the Democratic Republic of Congo and Zakouma National Park in Chad. The forest buffalo endures in Nigeria, Ghana, Ivory Coast, Guinea-Bissau, Benin, Sierra Leone, Guinea, and Liberia, while maintaining strongholds in the Democratic Republic of Congo, Central African Republic, Uganda, Gabon, Cameroon, and Equatorial Guinea. In 2021, an estimated 240,000+ Cape buffaloes resided in Tanzania, the most of any country and, between 1998 and 2023, substantial population growth was observed in South Africa, Mozambique, Namibia, Uganda and possibly Ethiopia. Tanzania and Zimbabwe were the only countries where significant dents occurred.

The increased presence of livestock and cash crops in West and Central African protected areas threatens the species. Effective conservation in this region therefore relies heavily on the regulatory decisions that are made. However, many protected areas in West and Central Africa are underfunded due to ineffective oversight, poverty, corruption, and structural instability. This is only made worse when considering that Central Africa has the most protected areas of any region relative to its size. Nevertheless, buffalo populations in some protected areas have recovered as a result of conservation measures. Human-wildlife conflict has also been mitigated through the use of hunting programs as a source of revenue for rural communities and wildlife agencies alike. Many African countries have slowly incorporated trophy hunting into conservation and development policies.

Privately and communally controlled land, as well as state-owned protected areas, are the main land management strategies used across Africa to conserve the African buffalo. Of the 37 range countries, private property is used as a land management strategy in only 5 Southern African countries. Since 1996, numerous breeding programs in South Africa have been initiated to help re-populate areas where Cape buffalo numbers have reduced substantially. By 2013, there were about 2,700 sanctuaries housing around 26,000 privately-owned individuals. Similarly, a conservation strategy to restore and maintain biodiversity—which has already been implemented in South Africa—is the responsible utilization of in-use marginal lands to fund wildlife restoration and help manage community resources. Groups that were once precluded from buffalo-related tourism, and production of buffalo meat and other products, can also be more easily provided with jobs and wealth. An attraction to tourists and hunters, as part of the Big Five game, and important for meat production, the African buffalo is vital for the success of such initiatives.

== Relations with humans ==
=== Hunting ===
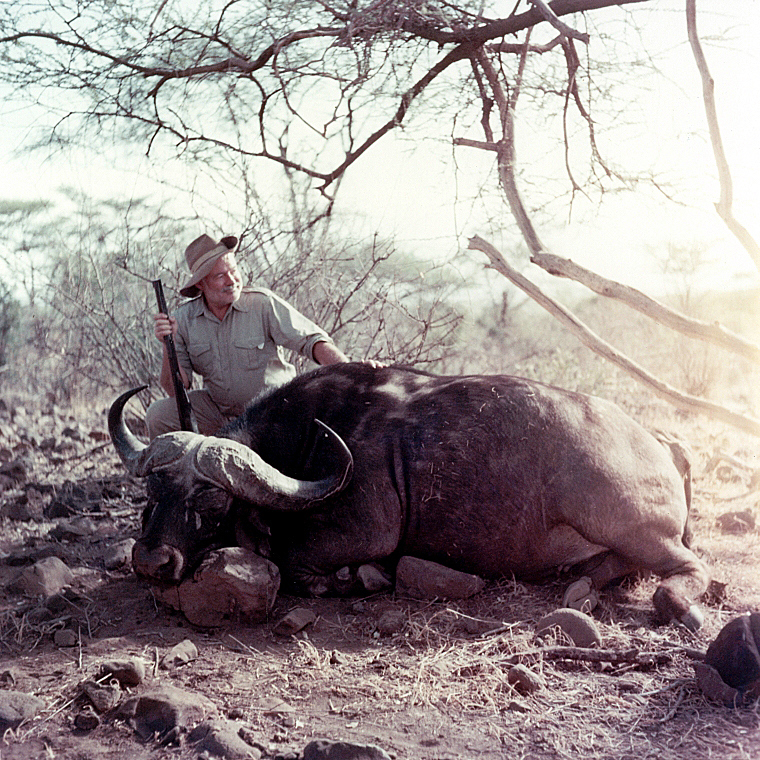
Ernest Hemingway poses with a slain Cape buffalo, 1953 or 1954

Prior to colonialism, the African buffalo served as an important source of protein for African societies like the Valley Bisa of Zambia, who regarded buffalo meat as integral to their identity and fate. In Ethiopia, the African buffalo is poached to increase one's social ranking, and among western hunters it is considered a major animal for trophy hunting due to the danger it poses during such activities. Out of 37 range countries, the African buffalo can be legally hunted in 16 of them as of 2022. Buffalo-caused human injuries or death have been reported and seem to happen regularly.

In the late 19th century, a rinderpest outbreak killed 95% of African buffaloes, and targeted hunting by foreign settlers led to further population declines. By the early 20th century, the African buffalo received protection from uncontrolled hunting. During the same period, safaris and hunting for sport became more popular throughout Africa. Starting in East Africa and expanding after World War I, hunting safaris became dictated by law and after World War II they became increasingly structured as a business. In other African regions, a rise in hunting safaris occurred following the 1970s permanent and temporary hunting bans in Kenya and Tanzania, respectively.

=== In human culture ===
Brass necklace decorated with buffalo heads

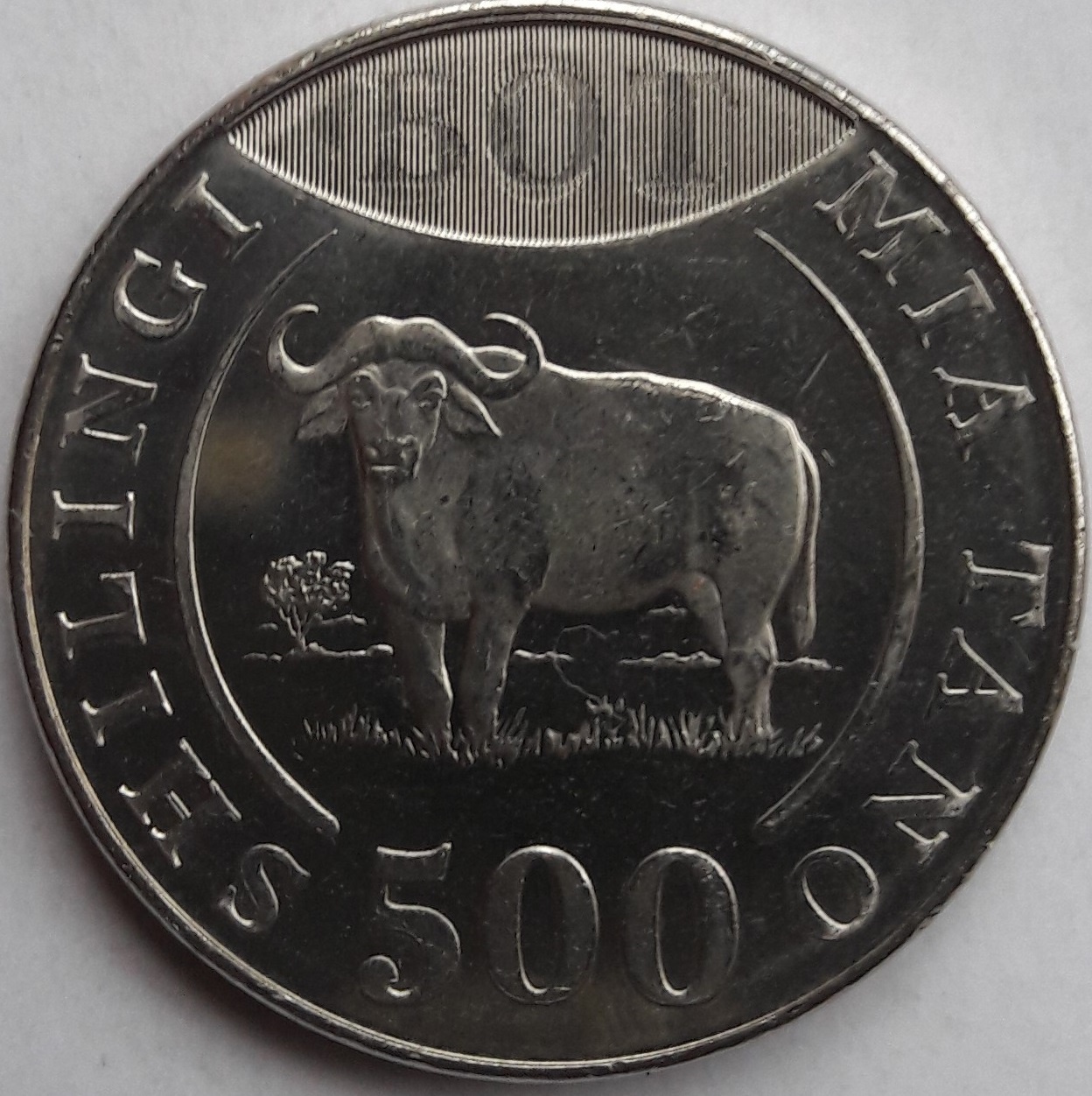
Reverse of a Tanzanian shillings coin featuring a buffalo

Humans and African buffaloes have co-existed for thousands of years; the earliest cosmological depictions of African buffalo in Africa are dated to the Middle Stone Age. Although it is positively affiliated in Ghana with the word "uprightness", it is described by hunters and African people as being wild, dangerous, powerful, intimidating and vengeful. Rock paintings of African buffalo have been observed in San culture and in some African societies, the species is used as a totemic symbol of strength, courage, danger and potent spirituality.

Masks of buffalo and similar species, which may signify a "bush cow", have been observed in West African tribes. Crosses between animal, human and spirit are sometimes represented with these masks which are used mainly for dancing and rituals during male initiation ceremonies. The transition from the natural world to human settlements is signified by cow masks and it appears that many rural societies in Africa have folklore that connects cattle to humans and buffalo to nature, in the context of livestock origin. For example, in North Africa, the Berber have a legend stating that the ancestry of all wild animals and cattle can be traced back to an African buffalo and a heifer, respectively. Analogously, in South Sudan, Nuer groups credit the African buffalo for being the biggest killer of people, and describe the species as being vengeful towards people because the common mother the African buffalo shared with the cattle was killed by humans. It is also believed that cattle avenge this loss by prompting people to fight and kill each other over them.

Many African cultures forbid people from invading a buffalo's space or using its body parts, including ethnic groups of southern Africa and Cameroonian pygmies, who do so for totemism and protection against demons, respectively. On the contrary, shamans and traditional healers commonly use buffalo body parts to cure ailments and disease, improve one's sexual life, and fight off demons.

The African buffalo has been used as an icon in numerous social domains, including sports, military units, merchandise, and shipping. The Buffalo bicycle is an African buffalo icon that is 'built for big loads on tough roads in Africa,' a slogan highlighting its size and strength.

== See also ==
- List of bovids
- Bovid hybrid
